= Juliana Drydock (1911) =

Floating dry dock in the Netherlands, last seen in Free city of Danzig in 1944

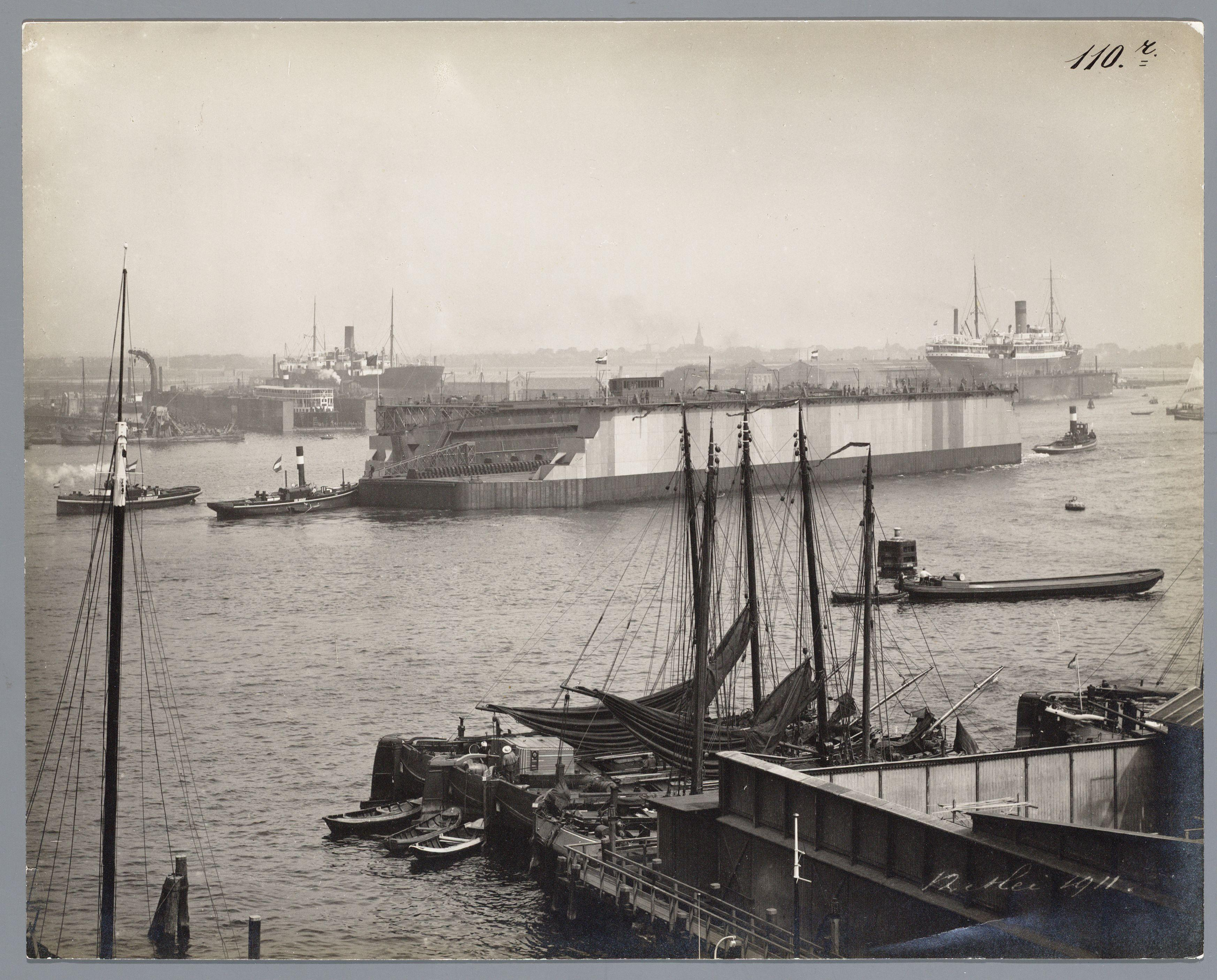
- Juliana Drydock is towed to her first mooring place next to Wilhelmina Drydock on 12 May 1911.

History

Netherlands
- Name: Juliana Drydock
- Builder: Nederlandsche Scheepsbouw Maatschappij (NSM)
- Launched: 12 May 1911
- Home port: Amsterdam

Free City of Danzig
- Name: Julianadock
- Owner: Danziger Werft
- Acquired: 18 August 1938
- Fate: sunk c. March 1945

General characteristics (as completed)
- Length: 1911: 459 ft 10 in (140.16 m) (Pontoons); 379 ft 10 in (115.77 m) (Sides); 1913: 615 ft 0 in (187.45 m) (Pontoons); 535 ft 0 in (163.07 m) (Sides); 1988: 176 m (Pontoons)
- Beam: 110 ft 0.5 in (33.54 m) (pontoons); 91 ft 11.5 in (28.03 m) (inside top); 79 ft 11.5 in (24.37 m) (inside bottom)
- Draft: 20 ft 0 in (6.10 m) (on blocks)
- Depth of hold: 14 ft 6.5 in (4.43 m) (center); 12 ft 6.5 in (3.82 m) (pontoon side)

Juliana Drydock was an old dry dock, last seen in the Free City of Danzig. It was originally built for the Dutch ship repair company Amsterdamsche Droogdok Maatschappij (ADM).

In the Netherlands Juliana Drydock was known as Julianadok, Juliana-dok, and Dok 4/IV. It was the fourth steel floating dry dock in Amsterdam. Julianadok was built to accommodate the larger ships that could reach Amsterdam after the North Sea Canal and its locks at IJmuiden had been improved in the last decade of the 19th century.

Julianadok was a self-docking dry dock. It was launched in 1911 and extended in 1913. Several of the largest Dutch ocean liners and warships were finished while on top of the dry dock. It was also involved in innovative jobs like the repair of MS Moldanger and the extension of SS Johan de Witt.

In 1938, Julianadok was sold to Danziger Werft in Danzig.

== Context ==
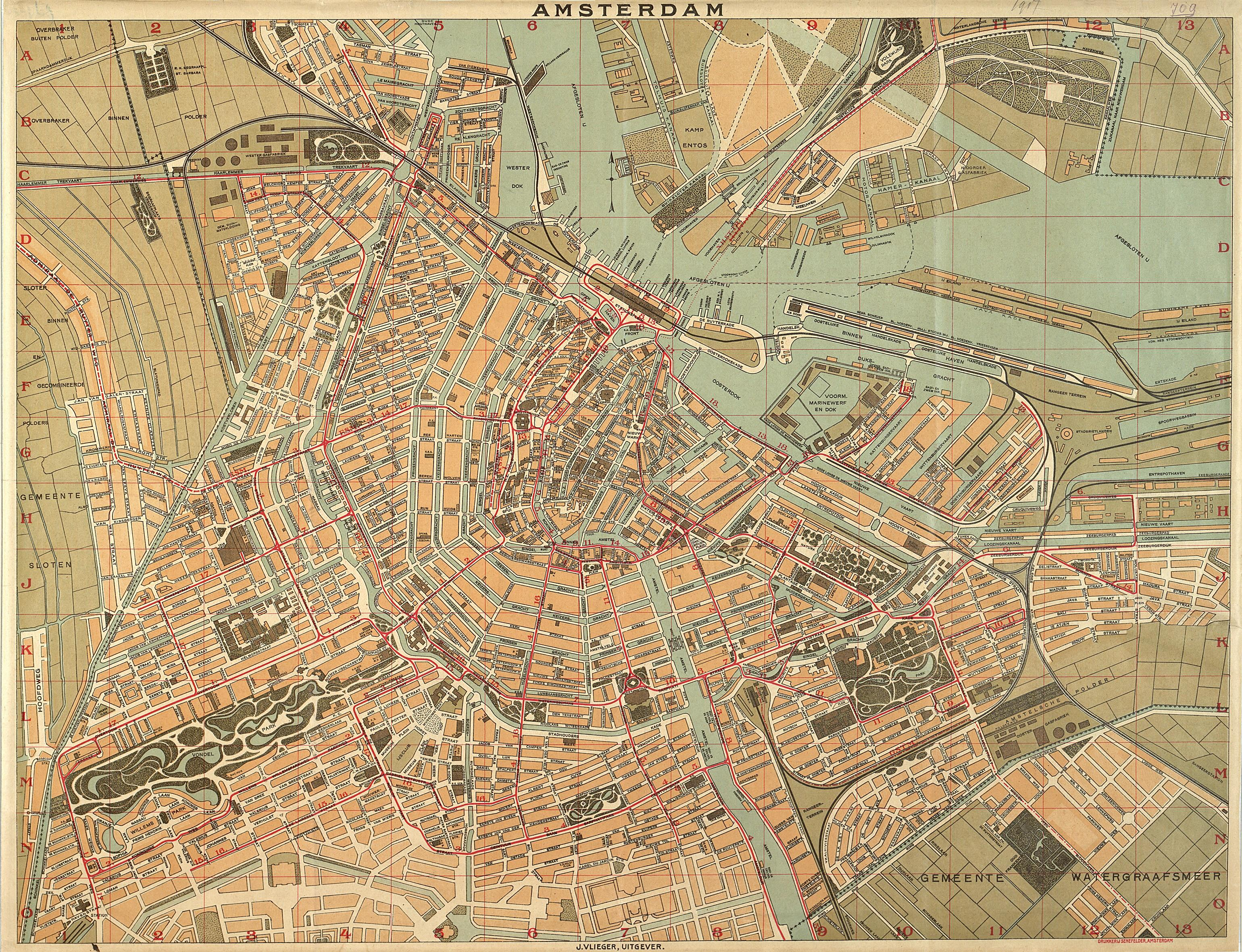
1917 map showing Juliana Drydock in its first position

By 1900, the Amsterdamsche Droogdok Maatschappij (ADM) had three floating dry docks in operation. The size of the ships that could reach these dry docks was determined by the dimensions of the North Sea Canal and the sea locks at IJmuiden.

In 1896, the Middle Lock in IJmuiden had been opened. This was the largest lock in the world and at the time, it was called Groote Sluis. It was 225 m long, 25 m wide and 10 m deep. On the canal itself, ships of 175 m by 17.75 m by 8.00 m were allowed. ADM's largest dry dock, Wilhelmina Drydock, was 129 m long, had an inside width of 22 m, and a depth on the blocks of 6.10 m.

In these circumstances, it was logical that ADM began to think of a larger dry dock. Already in 1908, ADM negotiated with the Amsterdam municipality about concentrating its activities near the location of Wilhelminadok. As soon as that dock of about 10,000t would be completed, Koninginnedok would be moved into a new harbor and Wilhelminadok would take her place. The new 10,000t dry dock would then be moored alongside Wilhelminadok. The 1917 map shows this situation.

== Ordering and construction ==
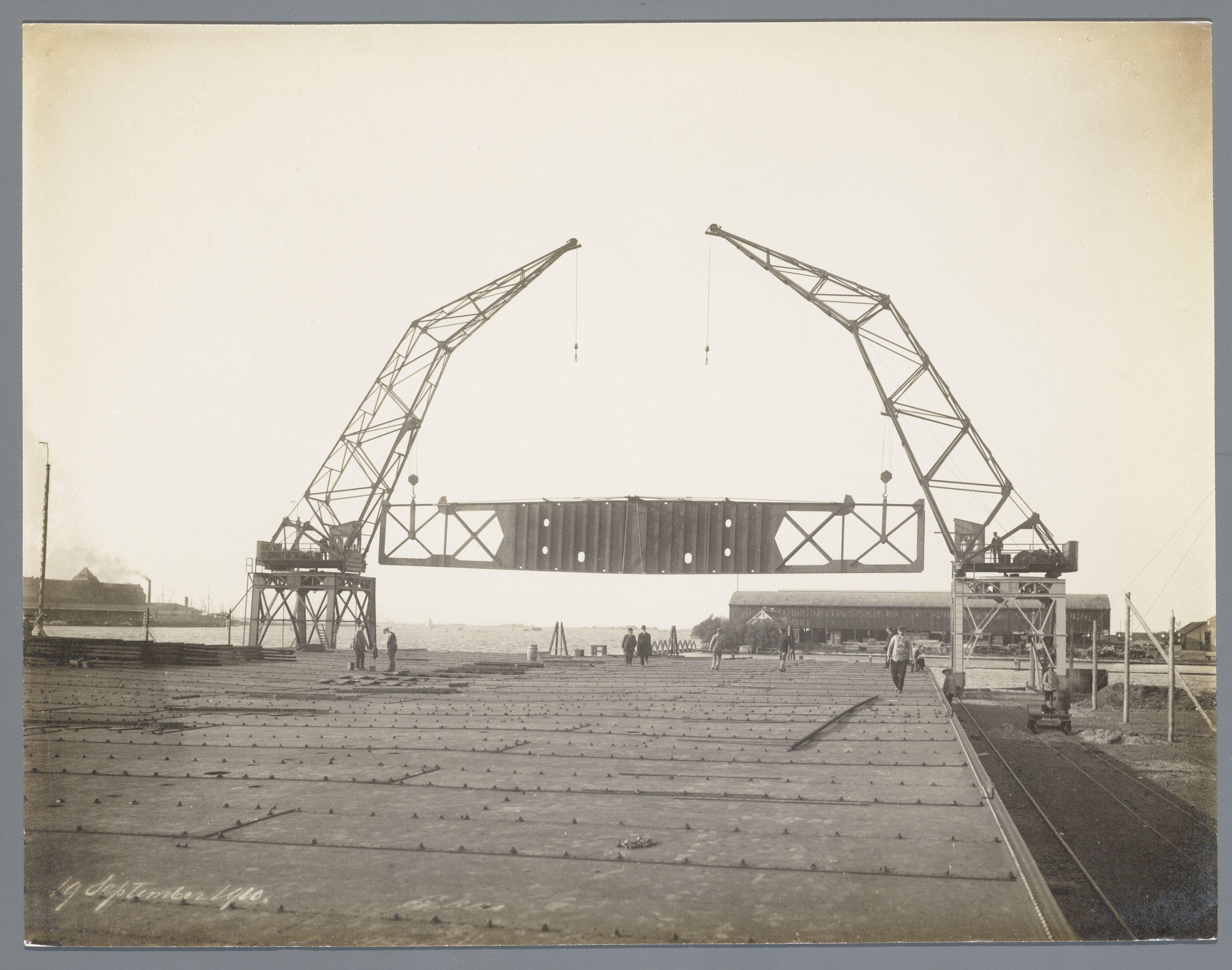
A frame is lifted above the pontoon 19 Sep 1910

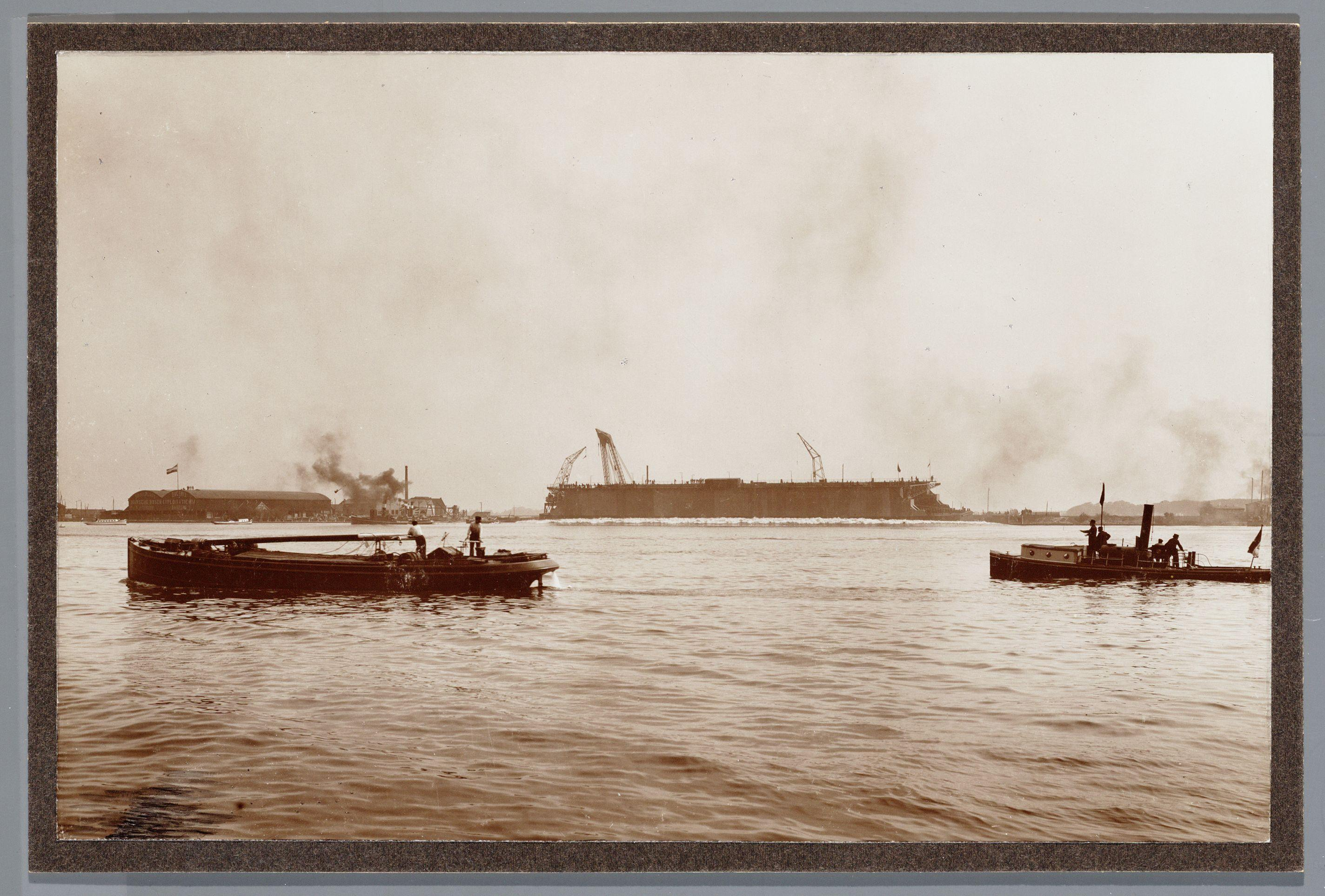
Launch with tidal wave

On 29 January 1910 an extraordinary meeting of shareholders of ADM mandated the board to issue bonds for at most 700,000 guilders. The loan had to be used as partial payment for a new dry dock. On 15 March 1910, the general public could subscribe to 400 one thousand guilder bonds at 99.5% with an interest rate of 4%. 300 more had already been taken at the same conditions. The public subscribed for 8,500,000, so many had to be disappointed. By early May 1910, the order for a 12,000t drydock had been given to the Nederlandsche Scheepsbouw Maatschappij (NSM).

By January 1911, it was known that the new dry dock would be named 'Juliana-dok'. The lift capacity of the new dry dock was then said to be 12.504t, and its own weight to be 4,900t, giving a maximum displacement of 17,404t. That same month, Koninginnedok was moved to a mooring place in a new dock that had been dug nearby. After the old mooring place of Koniginnedok had been dredged down, Wilhelminadok was moved to its new position on 8 April 1911. This allowed ADM to give the mooring place for Julianadok the required greater depth.

Juliana Drydock was built at the site of the old Von Lindern shipyard, which had built Koningsdok. This was referred to as 'opposite the marina', in Dutch jachtsteiger. The photo of the frame lifted above the pontoon shows the jetty of the Holland America Line (HAL) across the IJ in the background. See the 1911 map for both the Jachtsteiger and the Holland America Line.

On 12 May 1911 Julianadok was launched in one piece. After the Urk fishingboats had unloaded their catch and sailed away, the police started to evacuate the water between the Westerdok Lock, Buiksloterveer Dock, and the jetty of the HAL. At about 9:45 a blue flag was hoisted on one of the cranes near the dry dock. The police vessels hoisted a red flag. All other vessels then stopped and the launch procedure started.

The launch was started Mr. D. Goedkoop director of the NSM, and W. Fenenga executive of ADM cut two cables that held the dock in place. Some hydraulic presses then started to move the dock. It slid to the water over 16 sleds that stood on solid foundations. As it was a sideways launch, it created a wide tidal wave. This did not get far and caused no damage. The same day, the dry dock was pulled to take the old place of Wilhelmina Drydock.

After arriving in its place, Julianadok still had to be finished.

A second center section for Julianadok was built on the same site. It was launched on 7 August 1913 in very similar circumstances. That same day, two tugboats pulled it to Julianadok. This had already been split in a part that consisted of an end pontoon and another part that consisted of an end pontoon and a center piece. This work was expected to take only a week.

== Characteristics ==
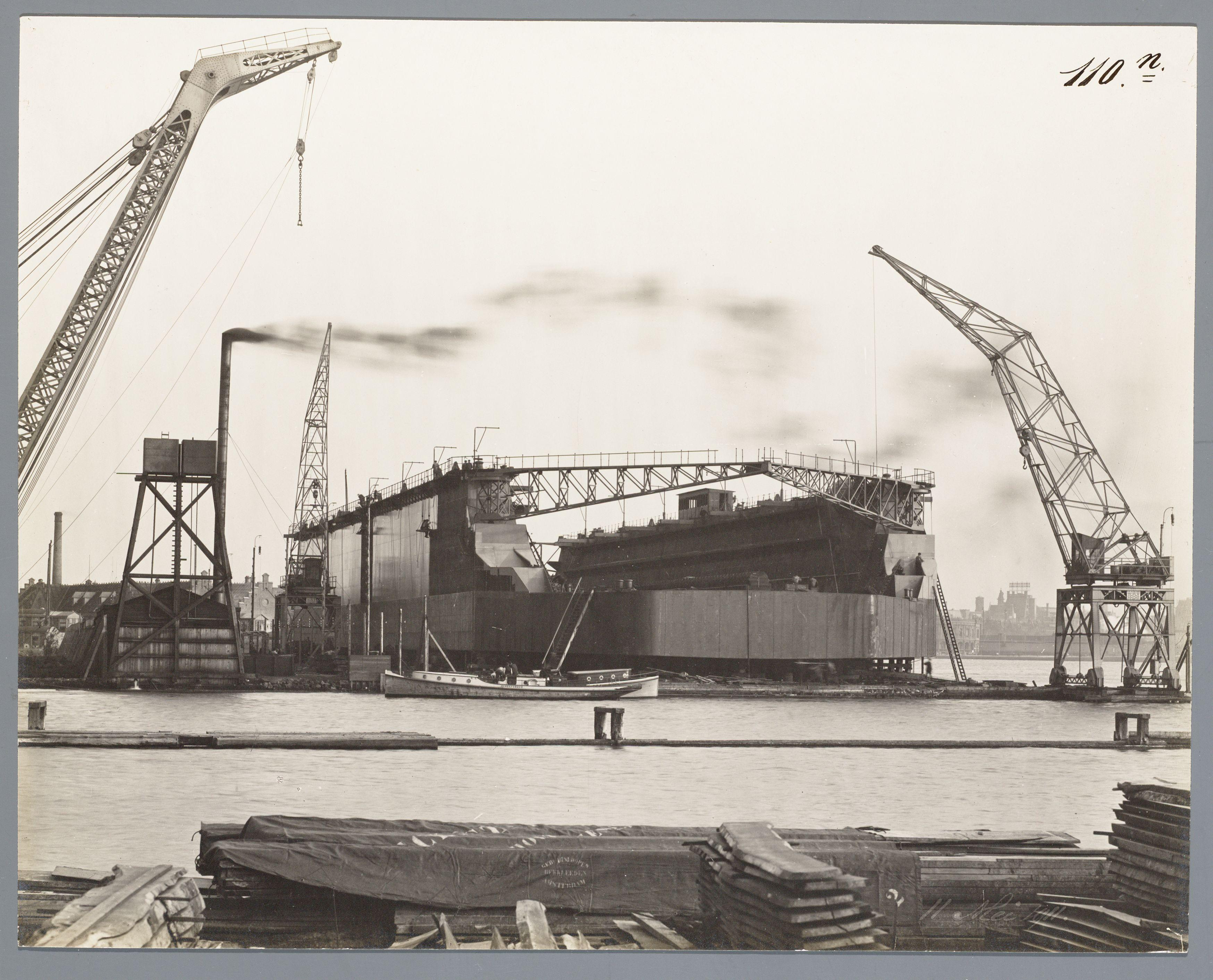
The pontoon is visible shortly before launch

Juliana Drydock was made of Siemens–Martin steel protected by bitumen enamel coating. It was of the self-docking connected section type. There were three parts; one center section and two end sections. Each part could be lifted and docked by the other two parts. The connection between its three parts was watertight.

The length of the complete pontoon of Julianadok was 459 ft 10 in (140.16 m). With only 379 ft 10 in (115.77 m), the sides were shorter. The width was 110 ft 0.5 in (33.54 m). The depth of hold of the pontoon was 14 ft 6.5 in (4.43 m) in the center and 12 ft 6.5 in (3.82 m) at the sides. The sides were 42 ft 0.5 in (12.81 m) high.

The sides were 9 ft 0.5 in (2.76 m) wide at the top and 15 ft 0.5 in (4.58 m) wide at the bottom. This would give calculated dimensions on the inside of 91 ft 11.5 in (28.03 m) at the top and 79 ft 11.5 in (24.37 m) at the floor.

Other important measurements were the depth of water on the blocks of 20 ft 0 in (6.10 m) and the dock's capability to lift ships of 12,000t.

Each of the three pontoons had three longitudinal bulkheads. Between them, the 3 pontoons had 8 more transvers bulkheads, which implies that one pontoon had two and the others each had three. The frames were placed 10 ft 0 in (3.05 m) apart. The part below the keel blocks had been reinforced. This also applied to the places were the dock would lift another part when it self-docked.

After the extension, there 204 keel blocks. These consisted of four pieces of American Pine with a cast steel cap. There were 40 bilge blocks, which could be moved from the sides. There were 18 shore beams to prevent a vessel from falling on its side. The capstans were driven by electricity.

There were three 18 ft 0 in (5.49 m) centrifugal pumps. These were each driven by an electric motor of 110 hp. At full capacity, they could empty the dry dock in four hours. There were also three smaller pumps, each driven by a 35 hp electric motor. The pumps and small engines were made by Louis Smulders of Machine Factory Jaffa in Utrecht. The centrifugal pumps were delivered by Electrotechnische Industrie v/h Willem Smit & Co, in Slikkerveer. The municipal power grid provided 380 Volt electricity to the dry dock.

=== Extension ===
In August 1913, the drydock was extended by inserting a second center section. This second center section was exactly the same as the existing center section. The extension brought the total length of the drydock to 615 ft 0 in (187.45 m).

== Service in Amsterdam ==
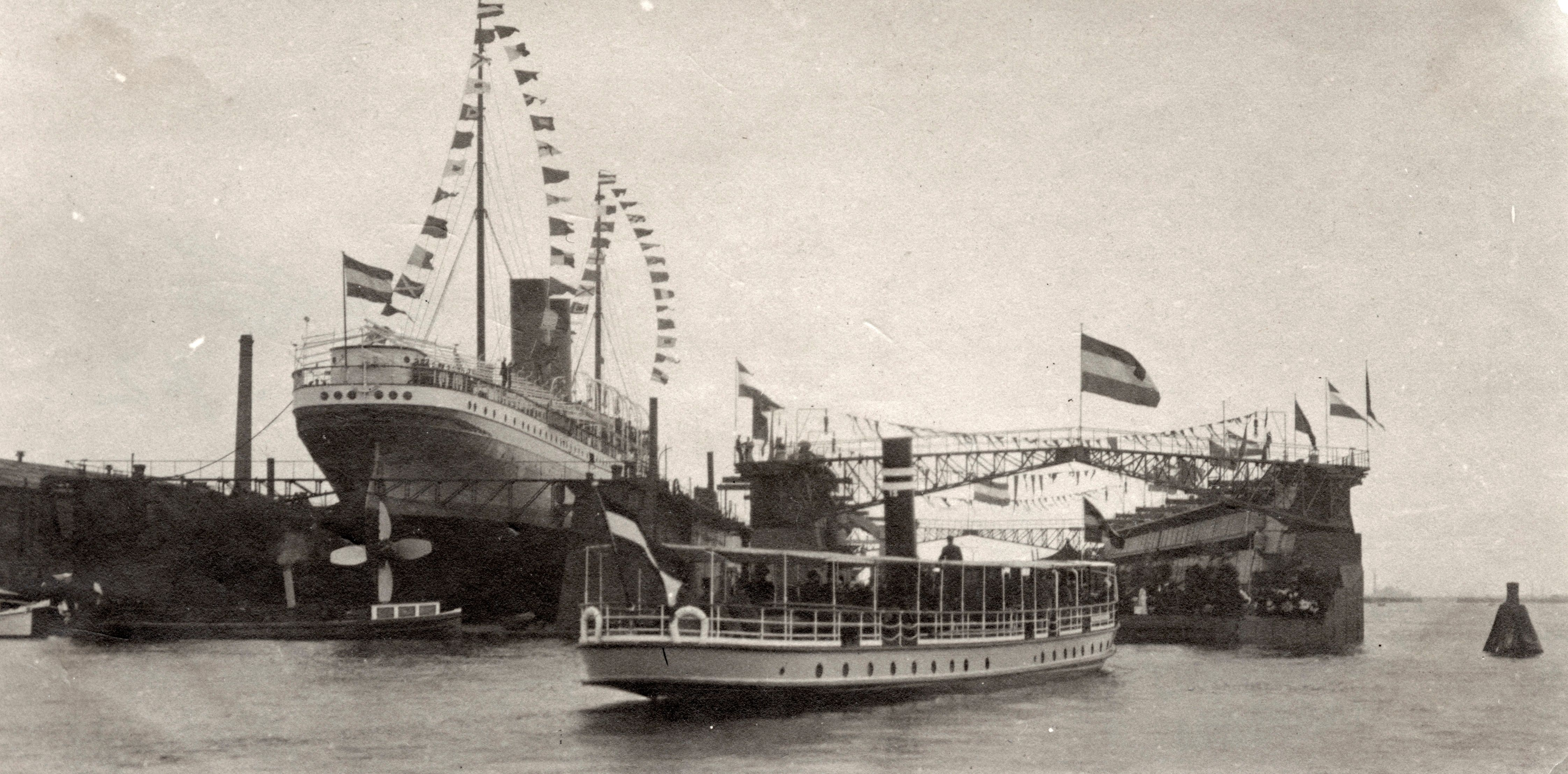
Visit by the royal family in 1911

On 9 June 1911, Queen Wilhelmina of the Netherlands, her husband, Queen Mother Emma of Waldeck and Pyrmont, and Princess Juliana visited Amsterdam. A big part of the visit was a tour of the new Julianadok. At 7 minutes past 11, the family arrived at the De Ruyterkade. At Jetty No. 9, the decorated steamboat 12 of the HavenstoombootDienst took them on board. Almost immediately, the armored cruiser Jacob van Heemskerck fired a salute.

When the queens stepped on board Juliana Drydock, there was no ship in it. The dry dock was richly decorated. After the usual greeting by the management of ADM and NSM, the queen was shown a model of Juliana Drydock, which made it possible to show the self-docking principle. There was also a model of Wilhelminadok with SS Koningin Wilhelmina in it. The visitors then ascended a special staircase to the top of Juliana Drydock. From there, they could look down on Wilhelminadok while SS Koningin Wilhelmina was in it.

Already in the year that Juliana Drydock had been launched, ADM decided that it wanted to extend the dry dock. This had to do with the size of new ships that were on order. Later on, SS Gelria and SS Tubantia of the Holland Lloyd were mentioned.

This extension had been foreseen in the design, by making the original drydock wider than normal for its length. Another section would be added, so the length increased from 460 to about 600 ft 0 in (182.88 m). Lift capacity would increase from 12,000 to 16,000t.

In late 1912 the board of ADM decided to issue 200 new shares of 1,000 guilders at 150%. This had to help pay for: the extension of Julianadok a.k.a. Dok No. 4; the acquisition of more ground; and the extension of the factory.

In August 1913, a worker on board the dry dock threw a match in an oil spill while the British tanker Barneson was on the dock. It led to a fire with a lot of smoke. The alarm was raised and firetrucks came in. Before they got to work, Mr. Fenenga, director of the yard had the fire extinguished by lowering the dock.

In the night of 20–21 May 1915, SS Jan Pieterszoon Coen was carefully pulled through the narrow Oosterdok Lock. At 4 in the morning, Coen was lifted by Julianadok.

On 14 May 1917, Wilhelminadok was moved to ADM's own dock, the 'Dokhaven' which had been dug from the IJ. Julianadok would then be moved closer to shore. By March 1918, Julianadok had been moved to its new position. The ditch towards the drydock was then dredged out to 9 m below NAP.

During the royal family visit to Amsterdam in April 1921, the 11 year old Princess Juliana visited Julianadok on her own. That is, she visited with: a dame du palais; her governess; and Baron François van Geen, secretary of the queen. The official purpose of the visit was to show Juliana what normally happened at the dry dock. Mr. Fenenga gave Juliana a tour of the dock and explained what the laborers were doing. On the other hand, the visit seemed like a rehearsal. The royal family had repeatedly visited an ADM dry dock, and Fenenga had repeatedly received the family at a dry dock. Surprises were very unlikely.

In 1921, ADM also ordered her fifth dry dock, the Hendrik Drydock of 25,000t. That same year, the Nederlandsche Dok Maatschappij was constructing another graving dock of 25,000t; this one a dug out dock. In May 1925 ADM's new Hendrik Drydock was christened.

On 4 November 1925 the light cruiser Sumatra entred the dry dock for a final check and a paint job. In December 1927, the new MS Christiaan Huygens received her propellers in Julianadok.

On 18 May 1929, the NSM launched the last pontoon of another dry dock that was named Julianadok. This was a 4,000t dry dock for the tankers serving the oil refinery at Curaçao. On 21 August, this Juliana Drydock passed the lock at IJmuiden.

Meanwhile, ADM had got a competitor, the Nederlandsche Dok Maatschappij (NDM). In March 1930, the new 18,000t MS Johan van Oldenbarnevelt was finished in one of the fixed graving docks of NDM. In September 1930, ADM did take part in finishing the sister ship MS Marnix van Sint Aldegonde, but for this it used the Hendrik Drydock.

On 29 July 1932 Juliana Drydock lifted MS Moldanger for inspection after a fire had severely damaged and sunk her. After removal of the engines Moldanger would be repaired on Wilhelmina Drydock.

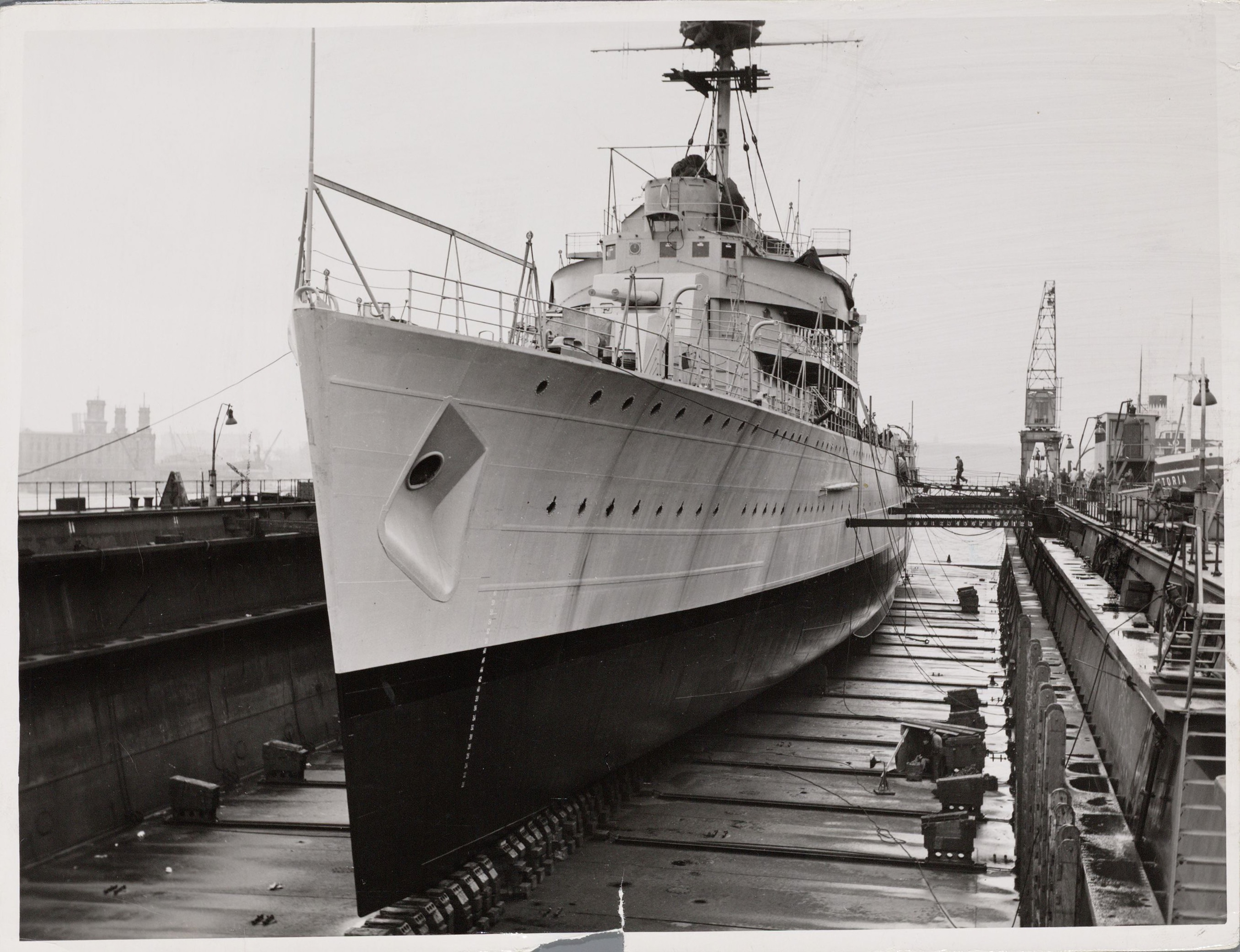
Light cruiser Tromp on Juliana Drydock

In mid-June 1933, construction of a new bow for the ocean liner Johan de Witt had started at NSM. On 29 July 1933, Julianadok lifted Johan de Witt just after she arrived from the Dutch East Indies. Workers then started to break of the part of her bow before the first watertight bulkhead. On 3 August a floating crane transported the 110t new bow across the IJ from the NSM to the dry dock. It put the new section precisely on the keel blocks before the Johan de Witt. It made the ship 7.15 m longer and fast enough to keep up with SMN's other liners. The advantage of this innovative approach was that SMN did not loose that much revenue, because the ship was out of action for only a short period.

On 8 February 1938, the light cruiser Tromp was taken into the dry dock to attach her propellers. It was probably the last notable use of the dry dock while it was in Amsterdam.

=== Sold to Danzig ===
To IJmuiden, August 1938

On 17 November 1937, ADM announced that it planned to sell Juliana Drydock to a company in the Free City of Danzig. One can speculate why Julianadok was sold. A likely explanation is that there was not enough work for the dry dock. In the same announcement, ADM said it would take the Hendrik Drydock into use. Which implies that Hendrik Drydock was no longer in use.

The transaction did take some time. Finally, on 4 August 1938, the contract to sell Julianadok to the International Shipbuilding and Engineering Company was finalized. According to the stipulations tugboats of Gebroeders Goedkoop would pull her to IJmuiden. From there, German tugboats would bring her to Danzig. After some delay, Julianadok was pulled from her mooring place on 18 August. This part of the trip ended at IJmuiden.

On 18 August 1938, bad weather prevented Julianadok and the German tugboats from leaving IJmuiden, where she was moored in the Spui Canal. The German tugboats were the Seeteufel, Möwe, and Dantzig from the Weichsel line. Two others were owned by Bugsier. On 21 August Julianadok passed the locks and left IJmuiden for Danzig. On 29 August, she passed Copenhagen.

== Service in Danzig ==
On 2 September 1938, Juliana Drydock arrived in Danzig.

== Service in Gdańsk, Poland? ==
After World War II, the site and what was left of the Danziger Werft and Schichau Werft was acquired by the Polish state company Stocznia Gdańsk or Lenin Shipyard.

It is not yet known what exactly happened to Julianadok during or after World War II. As it is actually quite hard to completely destroy a floating dry dock, it makes sense to check whether floating dry docks appearing in the area later on are the same as Julianadok. Remontowa Drydock No. 3 has dimensions very similar to Julianadok, but was built in the 1960s. Aldok-1 closely resembles Julianadok and is only a bit shorter. It is in fact a kind of sister to Julianadok.

=== Remontowa Drydock No. 3 ===
In 1971, there were three floating dry docks available for repair jobs in Gdańsk:

- Dock No. 1 135 x 25.20 m lifting capacity 6,400 ton
- Dock No. 2 156 x 27.20 m lifting capacity 8,000 ton
- Dock No. 3 176 x 28.00 m lifting capacity 11,000 ton

If Juliana Drydock survived the war and remained in Gdańsk, it could have been Dock No. 3, which matches its inner width. However, Remontowa Drydock No. 3 was a dry dock built in Hamburg in 1962 for the repair shipyard Remontowa. It was reported to be 175 m long, 35 m wide, and able to lift 11,000t. Obviously, 35 m was the outside width. In 1988, this dock was still mentioned with the same characteristics. In 1999, it was still owned by Remontowa.

=== Aldok-1 / Wilhelmina Drydock (1915) ===
Photos show an almost exact match between the bow of Julianadok and the bow of the dry dock located on Przy Pirsie in Gdańsk. That is, the dry dock located at 54.364756°N 18.651320°E in May 2013, see Google Maps. This dry dock is known as Aldok-1 and is not the same as Julianadok.

Aldok-1 is the old Wilhelmina Drydock, launched in 1915 by the same shipyard that launched Juliana Drydock in 1911. Some of the dimensions of Wilhelmina Drydock were: overall length: 510 ft (155.45 m); maximum width; 110 ft (33.53 m); depth of water on the blocks: 20 ft 6 in (6.25 m).

Wilhelmina Drydock (1915) was in use in Rotterdam until 1991. In 1998, it was acquired by Stocznia Cenal (Cenal Shipyard) in Gdańsk.
