= MV Sandhamn =

MV Sandhamn, or MS Sandhamn, may refer to:

- MV Sandhamn (2004), a passenger ferry used in the Stockholm archipelago, Sweden
- MS Sinfra, a cargo ship that operated under the name Sandhamn between 1934 and 1939
