= MS Fernglen =

Fernglen (1929)

Three motor ships have borne the name Fernglen:

- MS Fernglen (1929) was a 4,444-ton Norwegian cargo ship launched on 15 May 1929, by Akers Mekaniske Verksted in Oslo, Norway. Sold to Sweden and renamed Sandhamn in 1884, then sold to France in 1939 and renamed Sinfra. Sunk by Allied aircraft near Crete with great loss of life in October 1943.
- MS Fernglen (1936) was a 5,206-ton Norwegian cargo ship launched on 16 March 1936, by Götaverken in Gothenburg, Sweden. Sold to Greece and renamed Billie in 1963. Delivered to breaker's yard in Gemlik, Turkey in September 1972.
- MS Fernglen (1964) was a 7,436-ton Norwegian bulk carrier completed on 27 November 1964, by Rheinstahl Nordsee in Emden, West Germany. Sold in 1975 to Liberia and renamed Tyrol. Resold in 1978 to Greece and renamed Odysseus. Delivered to breaker's yard in China in May 1987.
