= Nederlandsche Scheepsbouw Maatschappij =

Dutch shipbuilding company (1894–1946)

Nederlandsche Scheepsbouw Maatschappij (NSM)
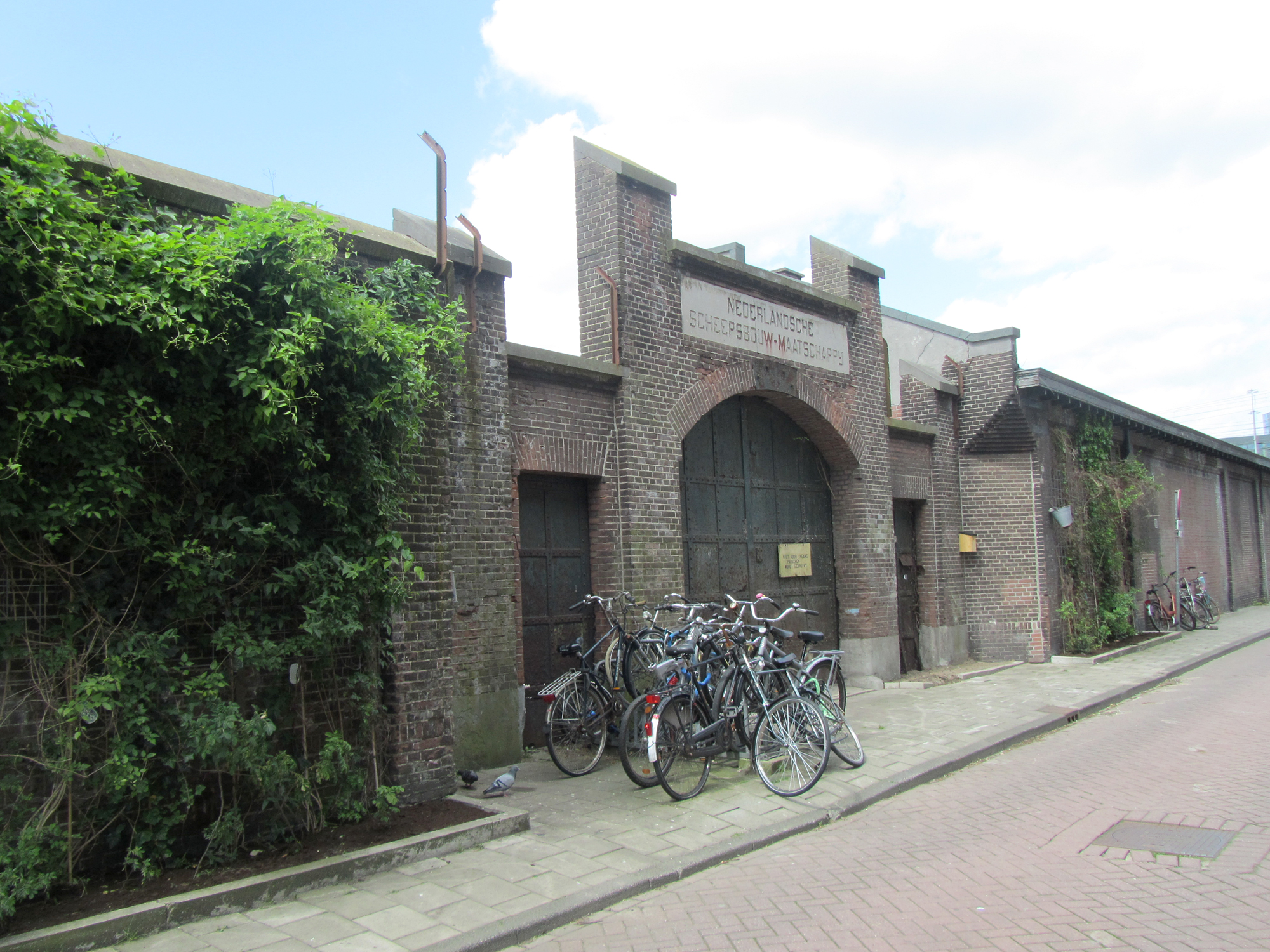
- Former gate of NSM shipyard in the Conradstraat
- Industry: Shipbuilding
- Founded: 25 August 1894
- Defunct: 27 February 1946
- Fate: Merged with NDM to become Nederlandsche Dok en Scheepsbouw Maatschappij
- Headquarters: Amsterdam, the Netherlands
- Products: Merchant ships

The Nederlandsche Scheepsbouw Maatschappij (NSM; from Dutch: Dutch shipbuilding company), was a Dutch shipbuilding company based in Amsterdam. It existed from 1894 to 1946. From c. 1908 it was the largest Dutch shipbuilding company.

== Foundation of the NSM ==
=== Successor of the Koninklijke Fabriek ===
The Nederlandsche Scheepsbouw Maatschappij (NSM) was a successor of the Koninklijke Fabriek, albeit only from an organizational perspective. When the Koninklijke Fabriek was restarted as Nederlandsche Fabriek van Werktuigen en spoorwegmaterieel (later Werkspoor) on 22 May 1891, the shipbuilding activities were stopped.

In 1893 former employees of the Koninklijke Fabriek then contacted Jacob Theodoor Cremer, and he founded the new company Nederlandsche Scheepsbouw Maatschappij (NSM). The literal meaning of the name was 'Dutch shipbuilding company', a name that would later prove not to be an exaggeration. NSM acquired (leased) the site of the former shipyard of the Koninklijke Fabriek, but not the site of the engine factory. Because it used the grounds and the former employees of the Koninklijke Fabriek, the NSM was a successor of the Koninklijke Fabriek, but only from an organizational perspective.

=== Board and shareholders ===
The contract for the foundation of the company was signed on 25 August 1894. Its first CEO ('directeur') was Daniël Goedkoop Jr. (a shipbuilder) The first members of the supervisory board were: J.T. Cremer (above), L.P.D. op ten Noort (CEO of SMN), W.J. Geertsema, Jhr. mr. C.J. den Tex and J.C. Jansen. Note that Cremer and Geertsema were also in the board of the Nederlandsche Fabriek van Werktuigen en spoorwegmaterieel.

The first 500 shares of 1,000 guilders each were bought by a very large number of persons. It gives the impression that there was not much confidence in the new company. Major shareholders were J.T. Cremer for 65 shares; Daniël Goedkoop Jr. for 55; Peter Wilhelm Jansen for 60; S.P. van Eeghen for 10; W.J. Geertsema for 15; H.C. van den Honert 10; Stoomvaart Maatschappij Nederland for 62; Oostersche Handel en Reederij 10; Johann Gottlieb Sillem for 12; Firma Lippman Rosenthal 10; L. Serrurier 10.

=== Plan for the shipyard ===
The plans for the NSM included a report by several experts that advocated 5 principles.

1 The shipyard would only be competitive if the workers could work in piece rate pay, doing the same work all the time. The existing Amsterdam shipyards had combined shipbuilding and ship repair. The latter led to disturbance in quick shipbuilding and prevented the use of piece rate pay, because the work was not continuous. (This vision opposed that of Fijenoord and RDM in Rotterdam, but wages were probably lower there.)

2 The nucleus of most of the workforce of current shipyards in Amsterdam had still been educated in the art of building wooden ships. Most of these people were older than suitable for shipbuilding. For many years nothing had been done to educate workers in shipbuilding. Young people would have to be educated in shipbuilding, and they could no doubt produce significantly more if they had an interest to do so.

3 The necessary materials for shipbuilding could be acquired (delivered) in Amsterdam for nearly the same prices as in other places with successful shipbuilding industries. There was no significant problem in this respect.

4 A new shipbuilding company should not limit itself to seeking orders in the Netherlands. Foreign countries should be taken into account to get orders. A Dutch shipyard that delivered solid work at a competing price might also count on a fair amount of work for Dutch shipping lines. This was especially the case now that these shipping lines got more and more convinced that their ships should preferably be built at Dutch shipyards, and that the government demanded it in certain contracts with these shipping lines. (cf. the contract between the government and the KPM)

5 A good shipbuilder that was located in an industrial center like Amsterdam, next to a renowned machine- and boiler factory (the Nederlandsche Fabriek van Werktuigen en spoorwegmaterieel (later Werkspoor)) did not have to build its own machines and boilers. On the contrary: it was far better that a new shipbuilder did not mingle himself in machine-construction. That way he could focus on the core business, while remaining free to buy machinery at the best conditions, or according to the choice of the principal. (This was contrary to the strategy of Fijenoord and RDM, and also to that of Van Vlissingen en Dudok van Heel.)

== First decades (1895–1914) ==
=== Setup of the shipyard ===
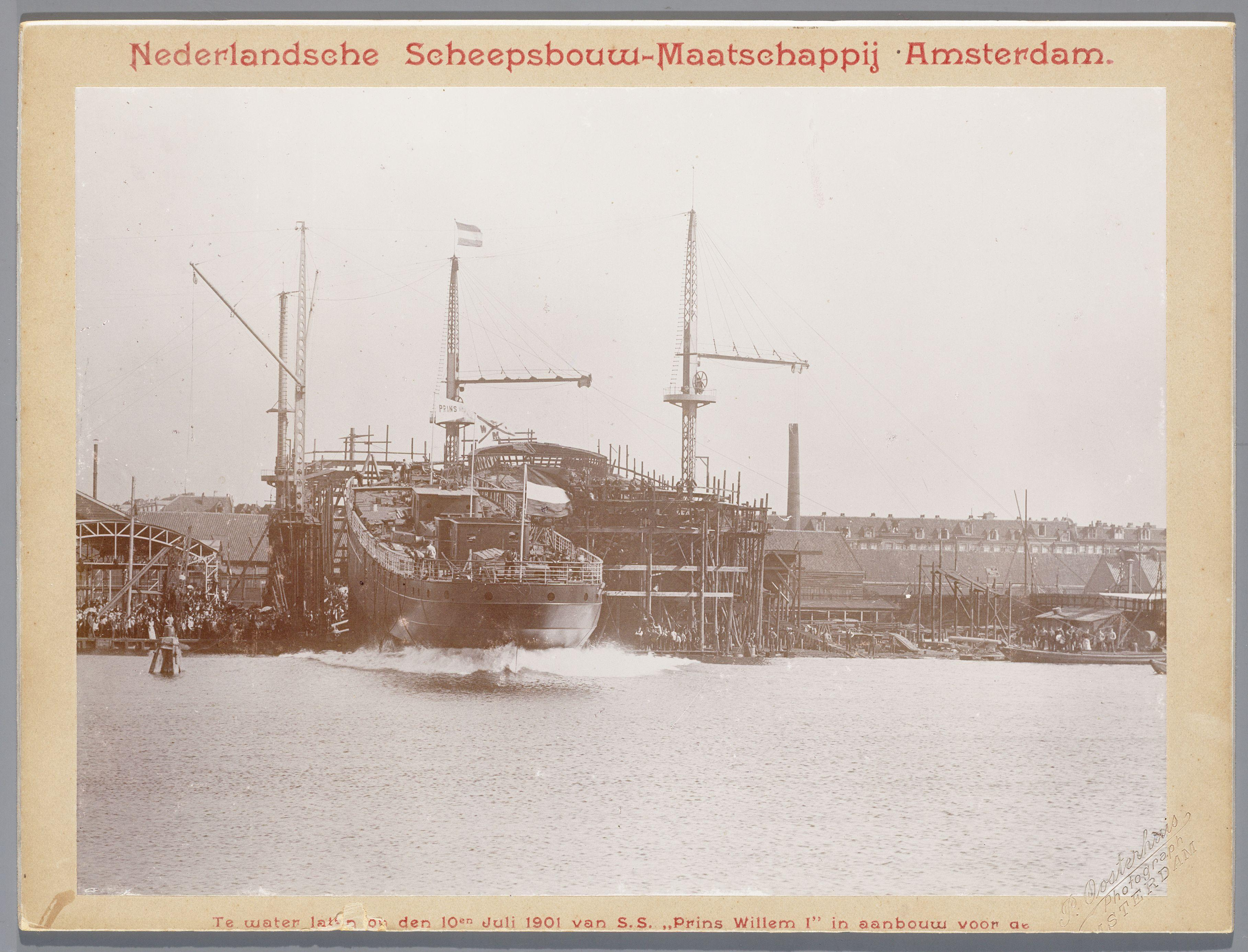
The first slipways during the launch of Prins Willem I on 10 July 1901

The plan for the shipyard had also determined that the site of the former shipyard of Van Vlissingen ( Third Conradstraat) would be the location of the new shipyard. The lease would be cheap, and the buildings could be bought. Plans to move to the other side of the IJ had been considered, but had been rejected for the moment, because the workers lived on the south side of the IJ. 283,000 guilders would be spent on buildings, installations, tools and machinery. Another 24,000 was for inventory, and the rest of the 500,000 was for working capital.

In mid 1894 the new company tendered the construction of some buildings on the site. The tender was for an office, a carpentry hall, a workplace with engine room and boiler house, a lunchroom with doorman's home. It also called for filling up a harbor and making fences and shoring for the site on the Wittenburgergracht and third Conrad street. The site had four obsolete slipways for ships of up to 300 feet (91 m).

On 7 March 1895 the NSM launched its first vessel, Amsterdam V. It was a steam vessel of 215 feet (65.5 m) and 600 ihp meant for a river service between Amsterdam and Mannheim. On 10 May 1895 the NSM launched the steel deck barge Lomboks Glorie. On 8 June 1895 the Van Outhoorn was laid down for the KPM. She was launched on 24 January 1896, the first ocean-going ship built by the yard. It was a steel ship of 1,700 tons, and was claimed to be the largest KPM ship for service in the Indies. Engines were made by the Nederlandsche Fabriek van Werktuigen en spoorwegmaterieel. As could be expected the first years were not profitable for the NSM. In 1894 it lost 3,078 guilders, in 1895 it lost 31,711.

The next couple of years saw a quick increase in activity. On 4 July 1896 the steamship Paramaribo of 177 feet (54 m) was launched. It had been laid down on 24 January and was ordered by the Department of the Colonies. On 7 August 1896 a suction dredger of about 350 tons was launched for the shipyard Conrad, and ultimately the Russian government. Another was launched at about the same time, and the third, a suction dredger hopper barge followed on 5 September 1896. On 15 May 1897 the Prins Willem V of 272 feet (83 m) was launched. In August 1897 the gunvessels Koetei and Siboga with engines from Fijenoord, were laid down for the Indische Militaire Marine. On 23 October 1897 the freighter Madura of 322 feet (98 m) and 3,250 GRT was launched.

=== Wilhemina Drydock ===
In October 1897 NSM got an order for a floating drydock for the Amsterdamsche Droogdok Maatschappij. It was to be a self-docking dry dock with a lift capacity of 7,500 ton. The price would come to 700,000 guilders. A comparison with its share capital shows that the order was very important for the new shipyard. On 13 May 1899 Wilhelmina Drydock was taken into use.

Because of the narrow Oosterdok Lock, Wilhelmina Drydock was constructed at a special site that the NSM leased. This site was connected to the former shipyard Gebroeders van Lindern, which had built the Koningsdok that still lay just west of it. This site currently houses the EYE Film Institute Netherlands.

=== Expansion on the Conradstreet ===
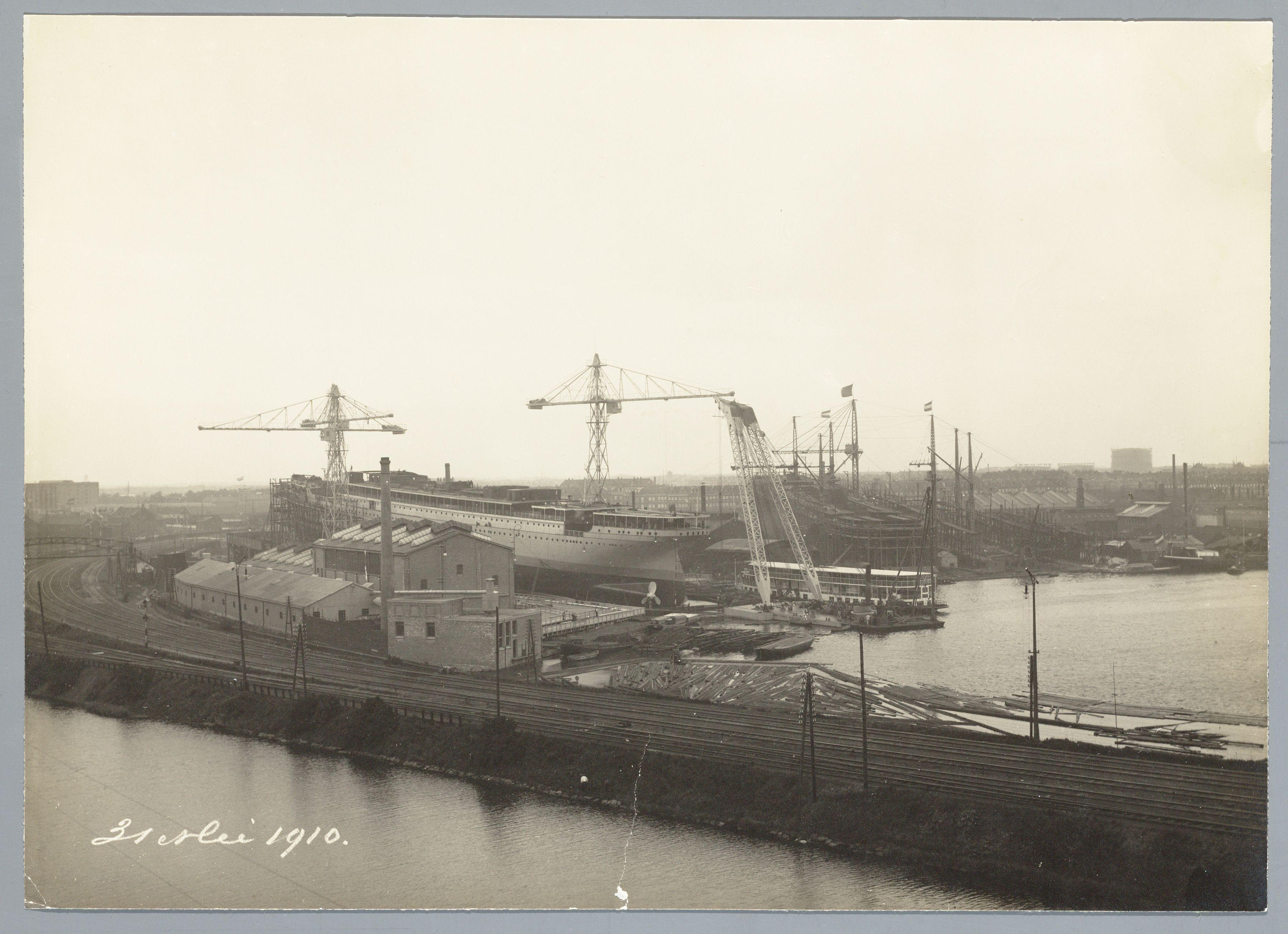
Prinses Juliana on the fifth slipway just before her launch on 1 June 1910

Soon the shipyard had a serious lack of space, and in 1899 the company leased a site from the Amsterdam Municipality to build a new fifth slipway. It also expanded its buildings. In 1908 the whole site between the third Conradstreet and the Conradstreet (where the gate now is) was leased. It allowed the lengthening of the fifth slipway. It was not a structural solution: The Oosterdoksluis, which connected the shipyard to the IJ only allowed ships with a beam of up to 51 feet (15.4 m) to pass. In the end this was solved, but there was also a railway bridge behind it, and this would not be extended to more than 18 m.

=== Becomes the largest Dutch shipyard ===
The infrastructural and other problems of the Amsterdam shipbuilding industry were so big that in 1905 the shipyards in Amsterdam built only 15,000 of the 180,000 tons of ships that were built. In 1907 the tonnage for sea-going ships was 51,000 tons, with the NSM as second largest shipyard with three ships for 10,500 tons. In 1908 the NSM was the third largest Dutch shipyard, with 4 ships for 6,600 tons after De Schelde with 11,000 and Fijenoord with 10,800 tons. 1908 was a good year for the NSM. It built 8 ships, had 11 under construction, and received three new orders. One of these was a large modern ship for the SMN. The company decided to invest 600,000 in a major expansion of the shipyard. The dividend was determined at 7%.

In 1909 the problem with the narrow Oosterdok lock (Oosterdoksluis) was partly solved. The lock was removed and its functions taken over by other works. The remaining passage was widened from 51 feet (15.4 m) to 59.4 feet (18.11 m). On 2 June 1909 Nias, 400 feet (120 m) long by 51.3 feet (15.6 m) beam, was the first ship to profit from it. The interests of the NSM had been important in the discussions about the Oosterdoksluis. Nevertheless, the interests of the Rijkswerf which was also dependent on the Oosterdoksluis, and therefore those of the Dutch navy, were probably more important. On 15 March 1909 the Rijkswerf launched HNLMS De Zeven Provinciën, an armored cruiser with a beam of 56 feet (17.1 m). The widening of the passage did enable the NSM to grow faster than before.

In 1909 the NSM was the Dutch shipyard that launched most tonnage with 15,054 tons, and the shipyard that had by far the most tonnage still under construction. In 1911 the total tonnage of launched sea-going ships was 85,000. Of this four steamships, a tugboat and a floating dock totaling 26,990 tons by NSM, De Schelde was second with four steamships 12,140 ton. At the end of 1911 NSM had 39,300 tons still under construction. In 1912 NSM built 4 ships for 31,000 brt, and RDM was second with 6 sixs for 19,000 brt. In 1913 the Dutch shipbuilders launched 110,000 tons of sea going ships. NSM launched five ships for 31,000 brt; RDM six ships for 31,000; Fijenoord three for 15,000; Wilton two for 1,250; De Schelde one for 9,000t; Bonn & Mees one for 7,000.

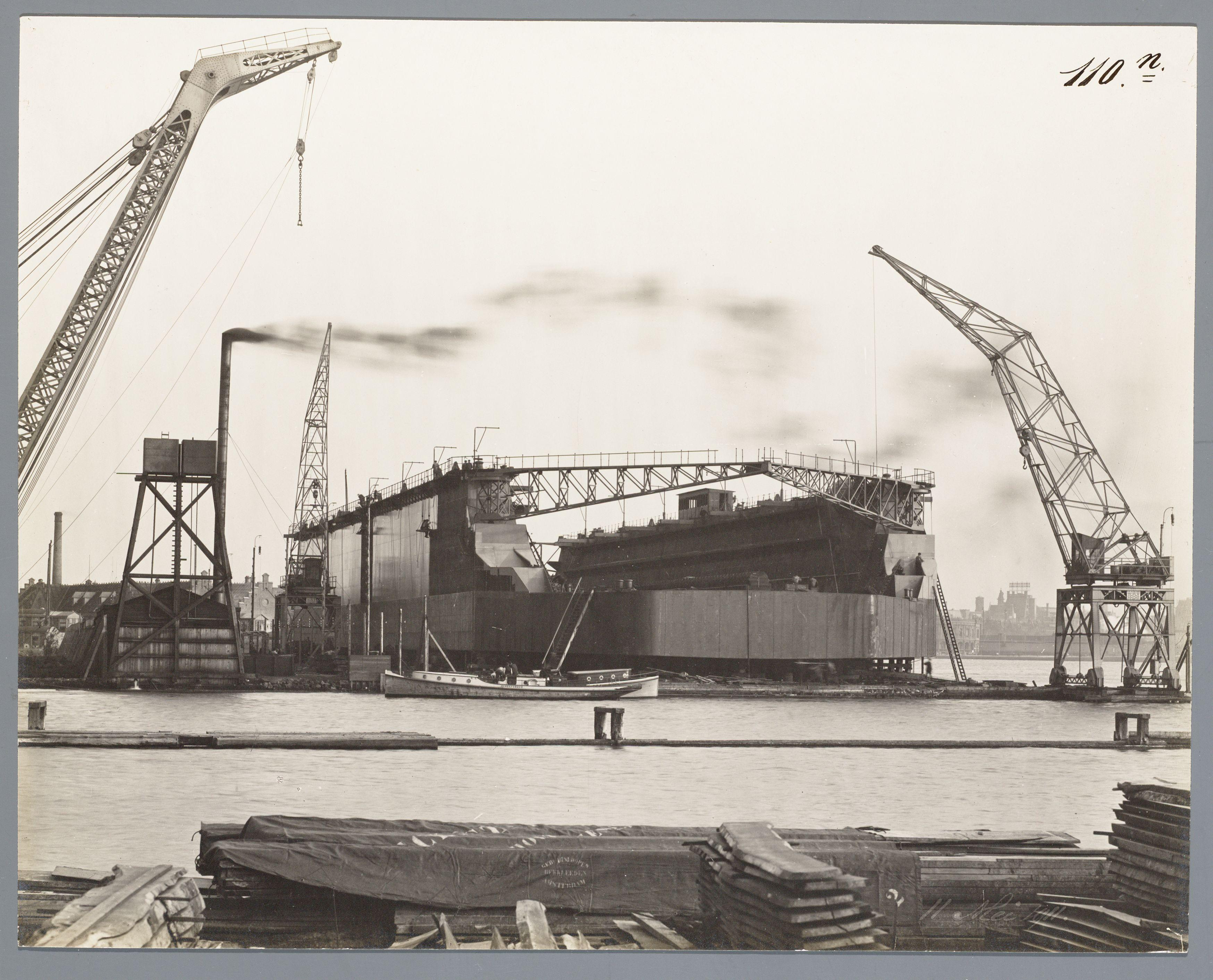
Juliana dok on 12 May 1911

The reasons why NSM became the largest Dutch shipyard are not that obvious. In 1933, Mr. Goedkoop would explain that the scientific way of organizing the work played a big part. This also regarded knowing exactly how much time a task should take, which enabled piece rate pay. A really interesting remark was that in some instances, the amount of skilled labor at Dutch shipyards was only 20% against 80% at some British shipyards.

In general, NSM built large ships. Prinses Juliana was 473 feet (144 m) long overall, measured 8,085 GRT tons, and displaced 12,190 tons (English). She was the largest ship built in the Netherlands up to then. Even before it was launched the SMN ordered a sister ship of the same dimensions in January 1910. This ship Koningin der Nederlanden displaced 12,190 tons loaded to be immersed 24 feet (7.3 m), and was launched on 15 March 1911.

On 12 May 1911 the NSM launched Juliana Drydock for the Amsterdamsche Droogdok Maatschappij. Due to its beam, NSM had built her on a site north of the IJ, so it did not have to pass the Oosterdok Lock. The large dry dock was built in cooperation with the Nederlandsche Fabriek van Werktuigen en Spoorwegmaterieel, Machine Factory 'Jaffa' from Utrecht, and Electrotechnische Industrie v/h Willem Smit & Co from Slikkerveer.

The dry dock capacity in the Dutch East Indies became insufficient in the early 20th century. NSM had many relations in the government commission that had to solve this. It called for a dock very similar to Juliana Drydock. In May 1911, NSM acquired the order for the Surabaya Dock of 14,000 tons. Surabaya Dock would be too wide for the North Sea Canal locks and was therefore constructed at a special slipway near Schellingwoude, so it could leave Amsterdam via the Zuiderzee.

The construction of Wilhelmina Drydock (1915) was made possible by the slipway at Schellingwoude. This Wilheminadok of about 13,000t lift capacity was built for Wilton's Dok- en Werf Maatschappij in Rotterdam. In September 1915, it was pulled to Rotterdam via the Zuiderzee.

== World War I ==
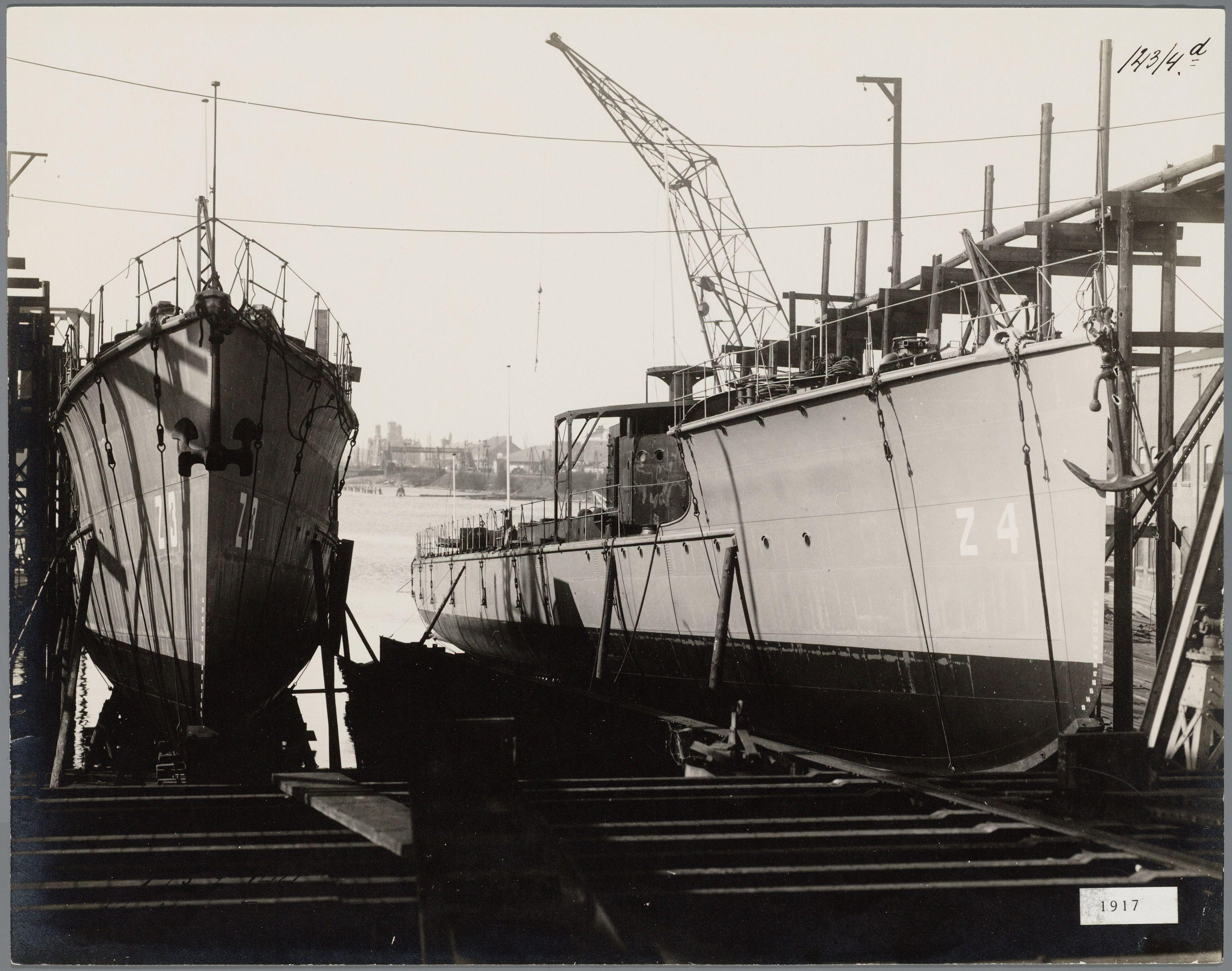
Torpedoboats Z 3 and Z 4 under construction on 23 March 1917

In general the first years of World War I were not bad for Dutch shipbuilders. However, while the war continued raw materials became ever more scarce. If the cost of building a ship was 90-100 guilders a ton in July 1914, it was claimed to be near 350 guilders in January 1917. Still, the shipyards had a lot of work during the first part of the war. Freight prices were sky-high, and so were the prices of ships. Dutch shipping lines seized the occasion to sell their old ships at a high price, increasing demand. Meanwhile the big part of Dutch orders that usually 'leaked' to British shipyards now went to Dutch Shipyards. The real problems for the Dutch shipping lines began with the resumption of the unrestricted submarine warfare on 1 February 1917, and especially the American declaration of war with Germany on 6 April 1917. Starting on 9 February the Dutch government then began to impound ships to sail on government orders at reduced prices. The objective was to get supplies at prices more affordable to the public, but this of course limited the profits of the shipping lines.

In 1914 109,000 tons of sea going ships were launched. With three ships for 23,000 brt NSM was again the largest Dutch shipyard. In 1915 103,000 tons of sea-going ships were launched. The NSM launched three ships for 16,000 brt, the RDM 7 for 25,000 tons. In 1916 the Dutch shipping industry had an even better year. It launched 71 sea-going steamships 1 sea-going motor schooner for 144,000 brt. The NSM launched two for 13,000 brt, Fijenoord launched three for 15,000 brt, RDM six for 24,000 tons. In 1917 the bonanza continued, with 87 steamships, and 28 motor schooners built for 167,000 brt. The motor schooners were small ships, they were smaller than the minimum size of 400 tons that the government could impound. To all appearances the NSM launched only SS Batoe and the three torpedoboats Z 2, Z 3 and Z 4. In 1918 68 steamships and 28 motor schooners were launched totaling 123,000 brt.

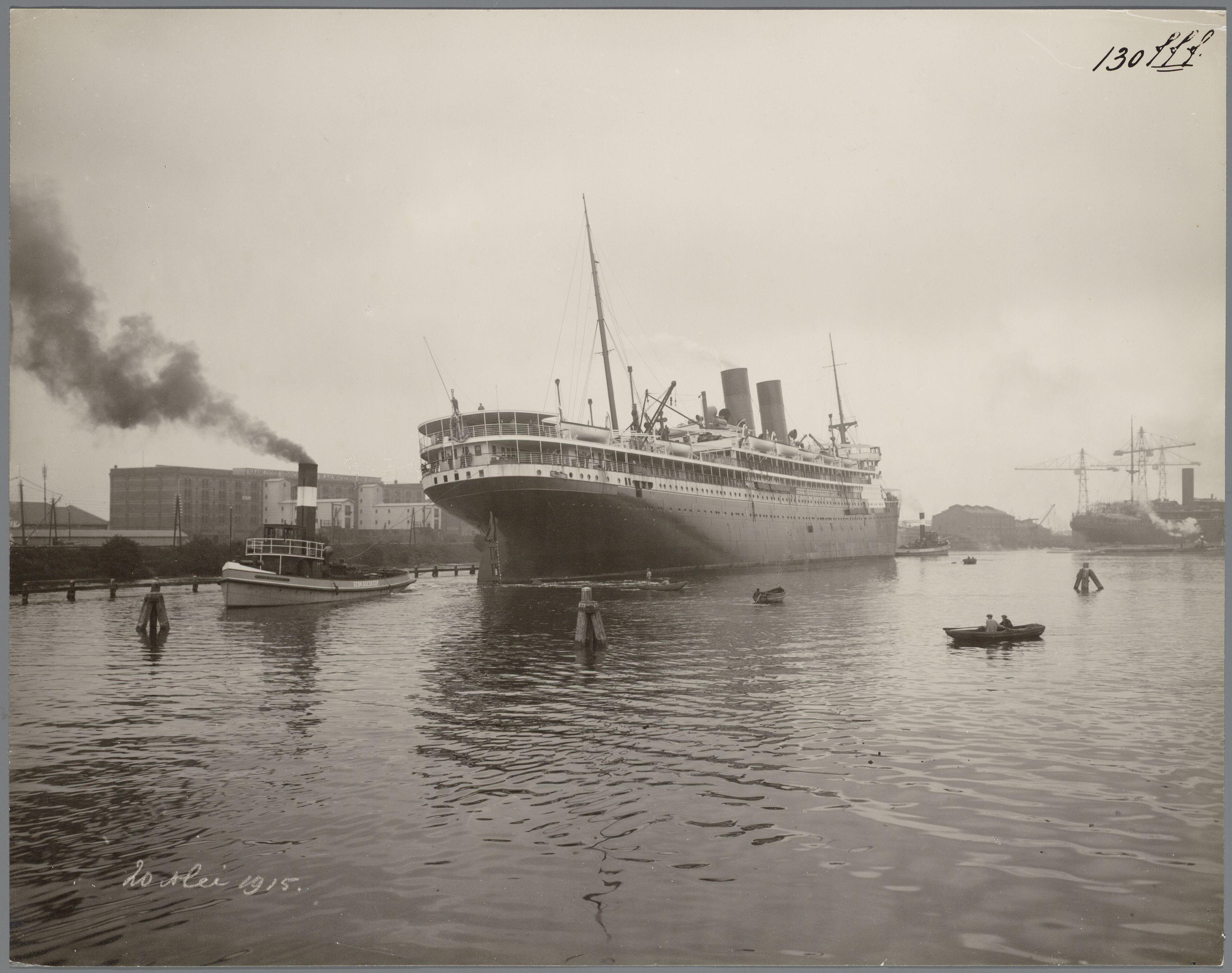
Jan Pieterszoon Coen under tow on 20 May 1915

One of the highlights built by the NSM during the war was Jan Pieterszoon Coen, 522.5 feet (159.3 m) long overall by 60.5 feet (18.4 m) beam and 11,694 GRT, launched on 30 September 1914. She was built while the entrance to the IJ from the shipyard did not allow ships with such width to pass. It was a move by the NSM to put pressure on the municipality and the railways. In the end a part of the Mariniersbrug (bridge) had to be removed temporarily so Jan Pieterszoon Coen could reach the railway bridge near the former Oosterdok lock. From this swing bridge part of the central pier on which it swung had to be removed. This would widen the passage from 59.4 feet (18.11 m) to 61.0 feet (18.60 m) so the ship could pass. After many negotiations and troubles this was done. On 20 May 1915 the Coen left the shipyard for the IJ. It got stuck in the Mariniersbrug for one and a half hours, and significantly damaged it. In the night of 20–21 May it passed the former Oosterdoksluis without a problem.

On 19 November 1915 the SMN ordered a comparable passenger ship of 482' by 59' and 30' hold to replace the SS Emma. On 2 September 1916 "Johan de Wit" was finally laid down. After the close down of the Rijkswerf on 4 July 1915, the Dutch navy ordered the light cruiser Sumatra based on a German design in October 1915. She was laid down on 15 July 1916, but work progressed slowly on her as well as on the Johan de Wit due to a lack of materials

All in all the maximum width of the exit from the Oosterdok spelled the end for the location of the shipyard on the Conradstraat. Already after the affair with the J.P. Coen the board had decided that a move to a place suitable for building larger ships was inevitable. After many negotiations a suitable site for the shipyard was found on the north bank of the IJ. It was situated west of Zijkanaal I, and it northern limit was a dead canal now called Corn. Douwes kanaal. The NSM got a 50 year lease with an option for another 25 years on 170,000 m2.

== Interwar period ==
=== First post-war years ===
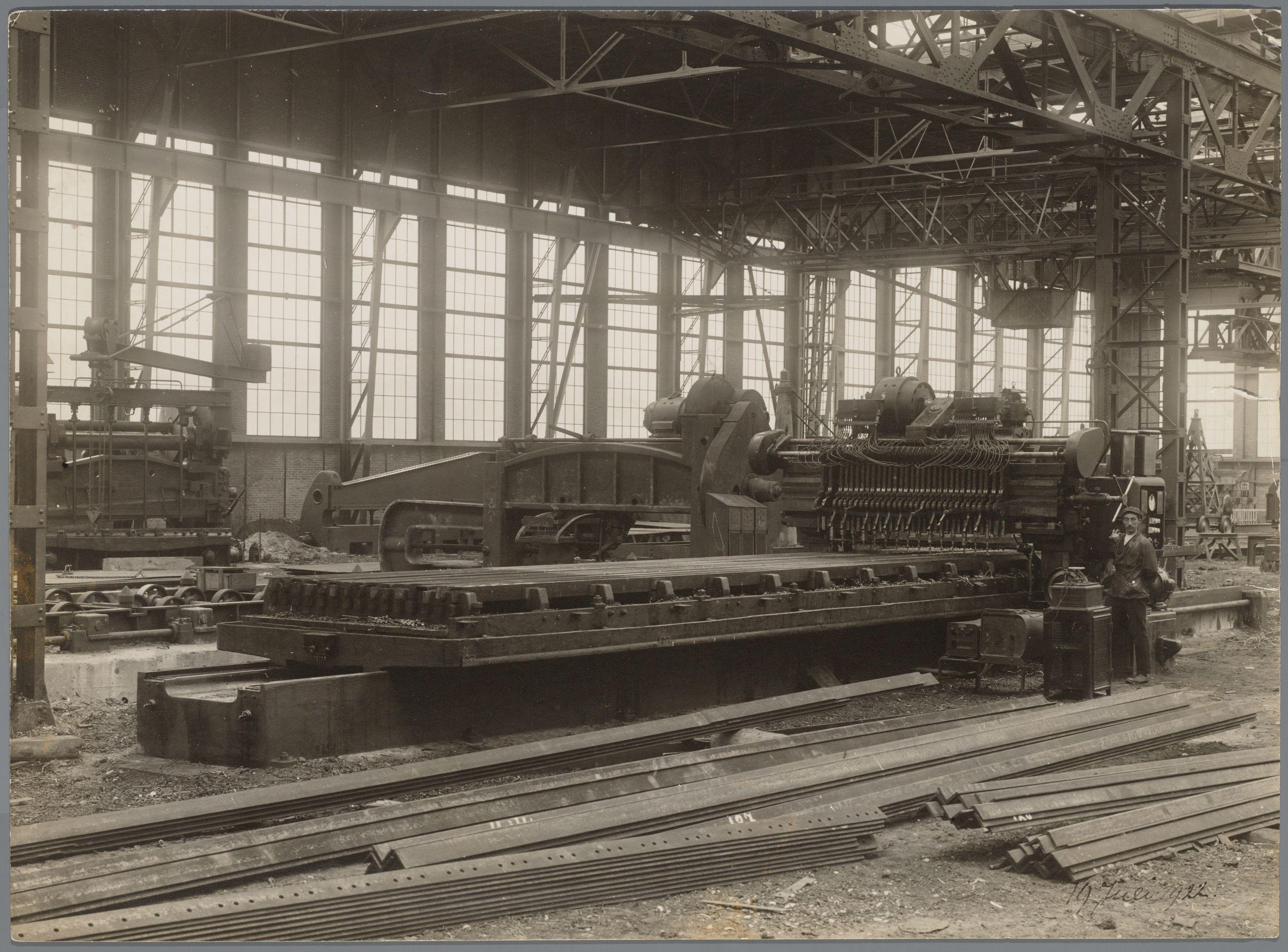
Drill machine at the new shipyard, 19 July 1922

Immediately after the war the NSM continued the investments in her new shipyard on the other side of the IJ. Wilton did the same in Rotterdam / Schiedam. In 1919 the launched tonnage of 149,391 did not increase from the wartime years. In 1920 the Dutch shipyards launched 298,991 brt, and the Netherlands were the third shipbuilder of the world. Meanwhile freight tariffs plummeted. This did not bode well, and when the ships in progress had been finished, very few new orders came in. By January 1922 the NSM had already laid off 400 men, and it expected to shrink further. Over 1920 and 1921 the NSM paid 8% dividend.

=== The new shipyard ===
On 6 October 1922 the new shipyard on the north side of the IJ was opened. Many of the workshops were in a main building of 459 by 410 feet (140 by 125 m) with overhead cranes and many modern machines. There was a drill machine that made up to 32 holes at a time, with the sheet metal moving automatically to the next position for the holes to be drilled. There were also very heavy metal cutting machines. In an engine house there were machines to transform the electricity from the municipal grid to the kind required to drive power tools, all machines being driven electrically. There were three concrete slipways, each 620 feet (190 m) long and 74 feet (22.5 m) wide, situated in parallel. The lower end of these slipways was below the waterline and closed of by doors, so ships could easily be launched by letting water onto the slipway.

=== Crisis of the early twenties ===
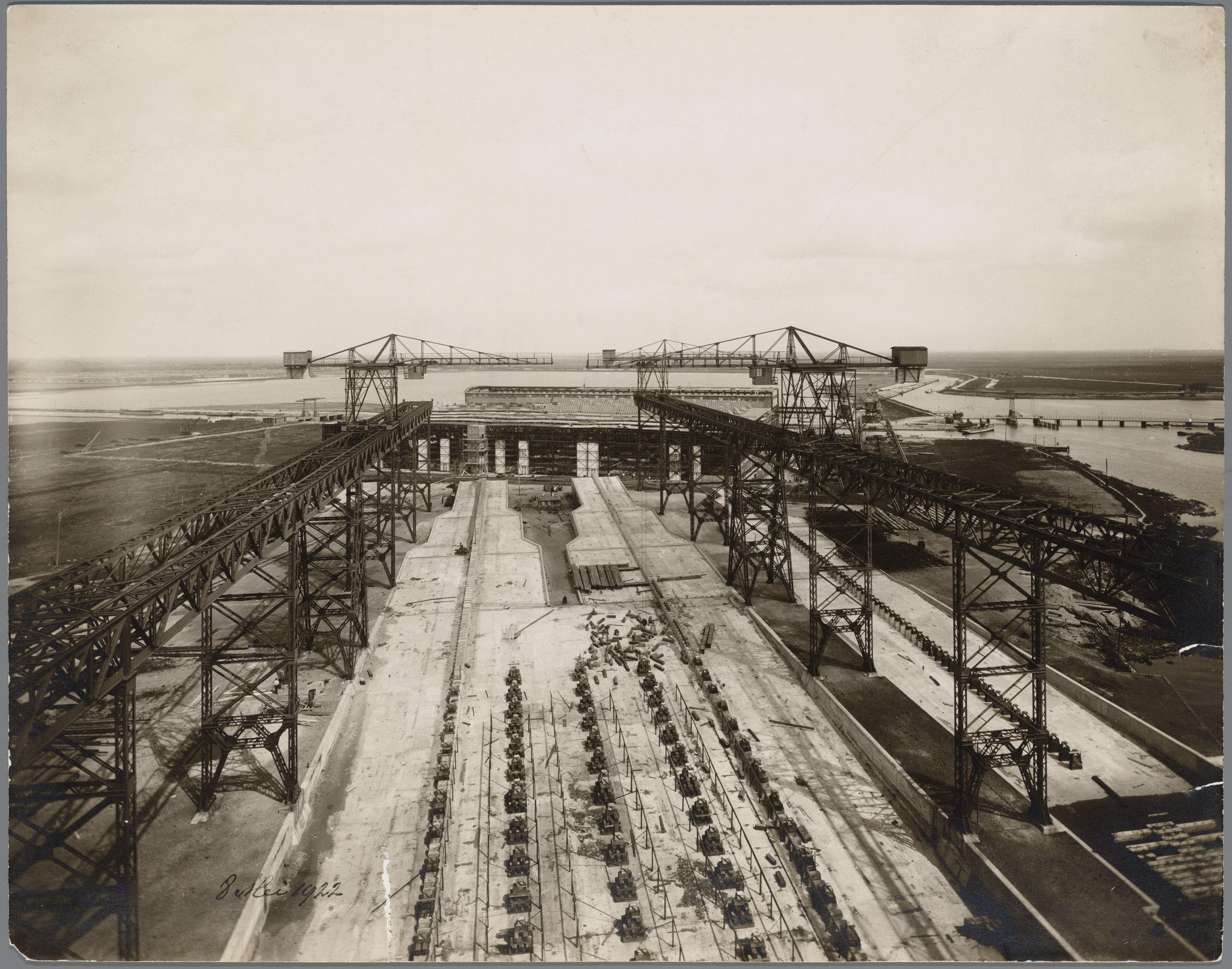
The two slipways that were combined to build floating docks, 8 May 1922

On the day of the opening the new shipyard started its activity with the construction of a new floating drydock using two of the slipways at the same time. It was ordered by the ADM and measured 650 feet (200 m) by 130 feet (40 m) and had a hold of 56? feet. Mr. Goedkoop, CEO of NSM noted that it was a bit weird to open a new shipyard while many were closing down. He noted that the situation of the shipbuilders had never been so desperate. Global tonnage was way above what was needed. Many ships had been laid up, and many of those still sailing did so at a loss. Shipping lines ordered almost nothing, and competition was so fierce that only very well established companies made a chance to get orders that did not result in a loss, or resulted in only a very limited loss. All this made that there was little reason for festivities, especially because there was no end in sight for the problems. Goedkoop thought the NSM to be able to withstand the crisis. It had an old shipyard that was well equipped, and written off financially. The new shipyard was very well equipped, and therefore also had a low cost structure. NSM also had competent staff and laborers. However, the shareholders, staff and laborers, from the board till the lowest apprentice should realize they would have to be satisfied with somewhat less than before. Indeed NSM increased its number of employees by 50% in the second half of 1922, but it also lowered its dividend over 1922 to 5% even while it had enough work.

In 1923 the English shipbuilding industry began to recover, but this was not the case for the Dutch shipbuilders. The only Dutch shipbuilder that had enough work happened to be the NSM. In late December 1923 NSM missed a very large order by the SMN. It was for a new Ocean liner and the first order in 18 years that the SMN did not place at the NSM. NSM offered for 6,270,000 guilders, but the Ateliers et Chantiers de la Loire in Saint-Nazaire offered for 4,900,000 guilders, something made possible by currency manipulation. The MS P.C. Hooft would be 520' pp long by 67.9' wide with a 38.6 ' hold for 14,000 brt. P.C. Hooft would be launched on 23 April 1925.

The results for 1924 would vindicate the careful approach of the board of NSM. The profit was 141 guilders and 30 cents while 126,301 went to depreciation. After the drydocks under construction at the new shipyard had been delivered, the NSM did not succeed in getting orders for the new shipyard. The primary cause of trouble was a lack of laborers combined with the high wages in Amsterdam. As a result the new shipyard was idle. Therefore the new shipyard was valued way too high in the books, requiring a 5% depreciation a year. As a consequence the profits would have to be designated to depreciations for years, before any dividends could be paid.

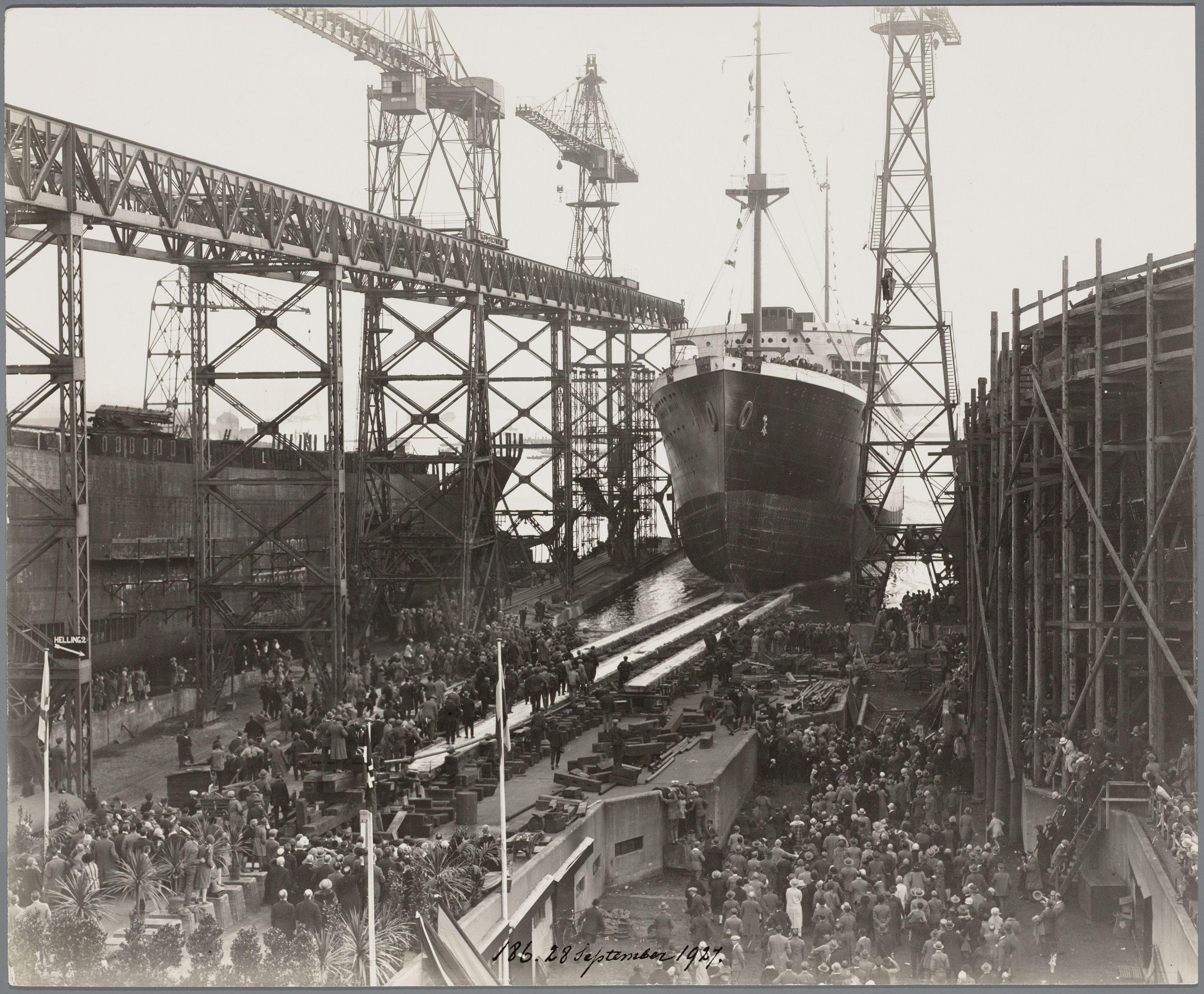
Christiaan Huygens at the new yard, launched 28 September 1927

In 1925, the NSM pursued multiple orders for cost price, or below, but would not succeed in getting a single order. A proposal to reduce the nominal share value by 50% was rejected in an extraordinary shareholders meeting on 22 June. In the evening of 10 December 1925, a fire broke out below the 590 feet (180 m) long big slipway on the Conrad street. On this slipway was a tanker for the Anglo-Saxon Petroleum Company. It was about to be launched on the 19th, making that the slipway had been greased. The fire would last for days. It totally destroyed the tanker as well as the slipway. The tanker was insured for 3,000,000 guilders, and a new one was laid shortly after on the new shipyard on the other side of the IJ. The slipway was also insured.

On 23 January 1926, a replacement for the lost tanker was laid down at the new shipyard on the other side of the IJ. It was the first ship that was laid down on the new shipyard. The tanker Clam would be launched after a short construction time on 14 August, probably because the rear of the ship that had burned proved fit for re-use and had been brought over from the Conrad street. Immediately after launch a new tanker Elax was laid down. The Clam was soon followed by Op ten Noort (class: Plancius) of 424.5 feet (129.38 m) for the Indische Pakketvaart and Christiaan Huygens (type: P.C. Hooft, but longer) for the SMN. The board noted that these two orders were very welcome, but were still taken at a loss. In December 1926, NSM also got the order for the Nieuw Holland for the KPM.

On 14 December 1926, the company officially moved to the new shipyard when the offices and seat of the board were moved. By then, 1,000 employees were working on the new shipyard, while 350 were busy on the Conrad street, working on the Clam that would be finished there. The Sumatra had been commissioned in May 1926. Only the iron works, forge and some cranes still had to be moved. In a meeting on 11 August 1926, the shareholders had agreed to reduce the nominal value of shares by 50%. The profit over 1926 was 94,436 guilders.

=== 1927: the situation stabilizes ===
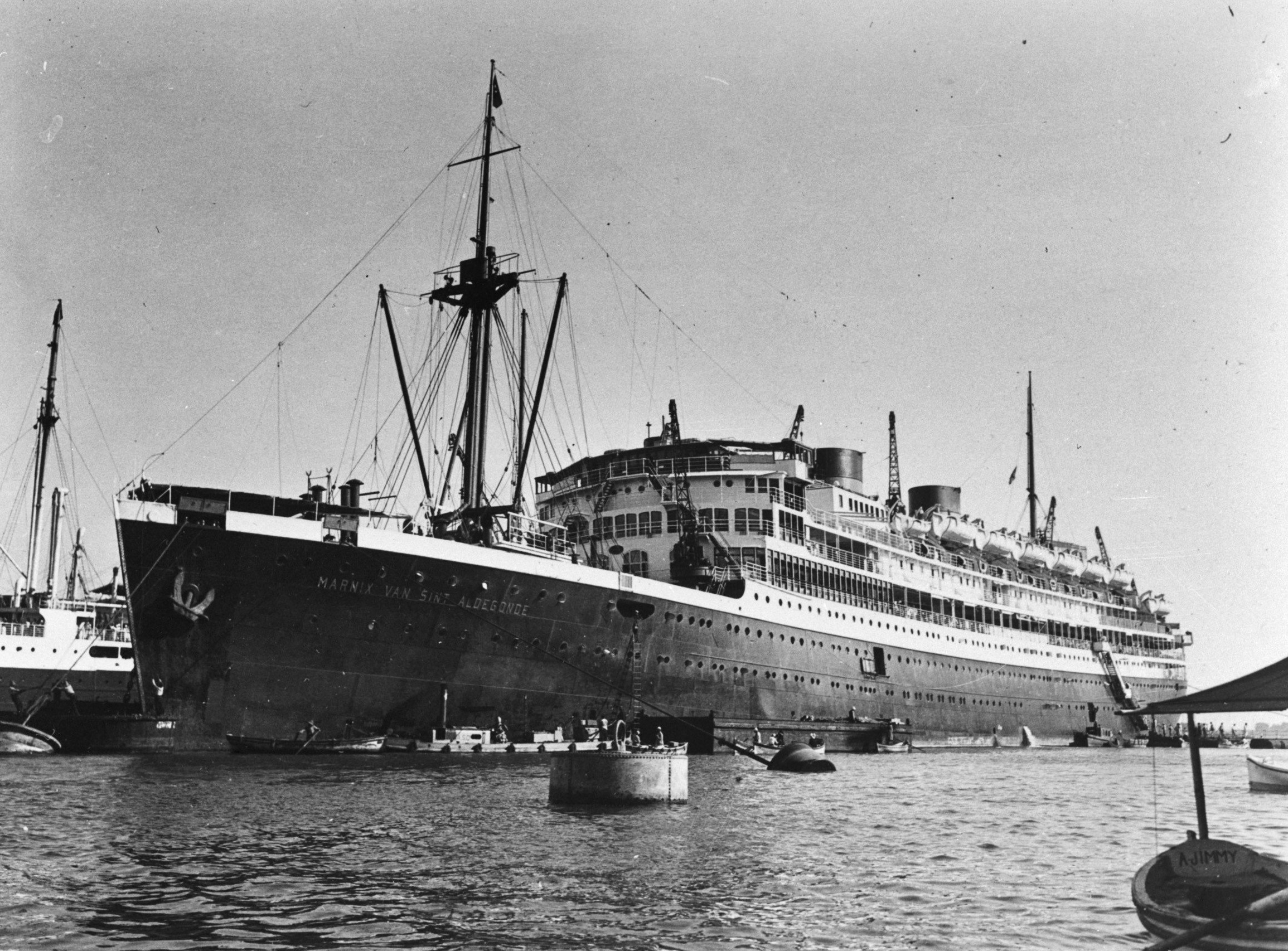
Marnix van Sint Aldegonde, 8 December 1928

In the first three quarters of 1927, 22 sea-going ships were laid down on Dutch shipyards. For the whole of 1926 this had been 7. The number of ships launched always lagged behind, but was 7 for the whole of 1926, and 33 for the first three quarters of 1927. This was not enough to keep the shipyards in operation, but the numbers did announce the end of the crisis. For the NSM this had been much worse than for RDM, ADM and Wilton that each had a repair branch.

In January 1928, the SMN ordered two 18,000–19,000 brt ships of 14,000 hp at the NSM. The first was Johan van Oldebarneveld, to be delivered in February 1930, the other was Marnix van Sint Aldegonde to be delivered in July 1930. Both were the largest ships built in the Netherlands till that date, and the dimensions (Marnix: 586.2 feet (178.7 m) long, 74.8 feet (22.8 m) beam) proved the necessity of the move to the new shipyard. By then the NSM had orders for 10 ships, and in 1928 production would hit a record high. The dividend over 1928 was 5%, the first dividend since that of 1922. 1929 was a still better year in terms of production hitting a new record high. Dividend over 1929 was 6%.

=== The Great depression ===
Moldanger on fire at NSM

NSM suffered far less from the Great Depression than other Dutch shipbuilders. It was the only Dutch shipyard that was able to continue to build a significant number of ships for foreign customers. This was in part achieved by innovation: NSM shifted to building tankers and concentrated on motor ships and other innovations. NSM also profited from institutional political connections. Finally, necessity played a role. Unlike other shipyards, NSM did not have the option to try to ride out the crisis by repairing ships.

Operating on the world market for ship construction, Dutch shipbuilders were severely impeded by the Dutch government clinging to the gold standard. The tonnage ordered by and under construction for Dutch companies on Dutch shipyards had diminished from 213,000 brt to 182,400 brt. From the end of 1930 till the end of 1931, these numbers were 189,720 and 48,800 brt.

The Great Depression did not immediately hit NSM. In January 1931, it got orders for Both and Reael of 299.4 feet (91.3 m) for KPM. In March 1930, it received an order for two tankers of 10,500 tons for Anglo-Saxon Petroleum. In early 1930, finishing Johan van Oldebarneveld and Marnix van St. Aldegonde still gave so much work that the NSM employed 2,500 men. At the end of the year, there were 1,600 employees left.

In 1932, NSM launched three refrigerated cargo ships for Westfal-Larsen. One of these, MS Moldanger suffered from a disastrous fire, occasioning a costly partial rebuilt. That same year NSM did rigorous cost cutting, and succeeded in still making a profit of 81,958 guilders. There was no dividend over 1932, and work in progress dwindled down to a handful of ships and bridges in early 1933. 1933 showed almost the same activity as the previous year, but it showed a loss. Prices were getting worse because the currencies of surrounding countries that built ships were deprecated. In 1934, the crisis seriously hit the results of the NSM. It incurred a loss of 194,879 guilders. The comment of the board was that all major shipbuilding countries had deprecated their currency by at least 40%. Indeed the Dutch shipbuilding industry slipped from third place to seventh place in these years.

=== Recovery ===
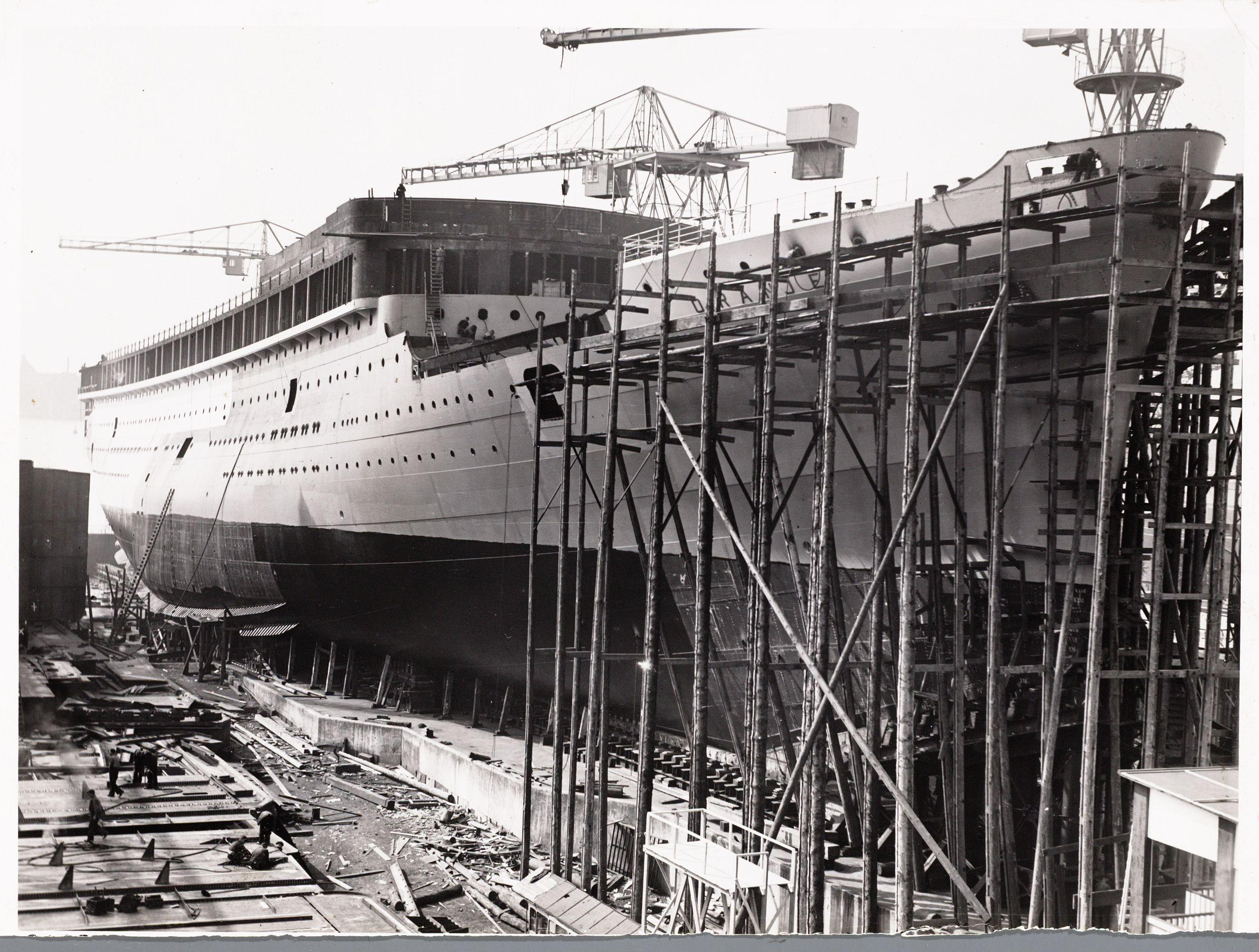
Oranje on the slipway

1935 saw a slight increase in the number of ships under construction at NSM, but orders were still taken at a loss. Over 1935, the government paid part of the loss of 270,957 guilders. The board noted that Dutch shipyards could build ships in less man hours than foreign shipyards. Nevertheless, at the same price in the buyer currency, the NSM had to work at a loss while foreign companies made a profit. The work on HNLMS Tromp laid down in January 1936 gave some air to the NSM. On 27 September 1936, the Netherlands finally left the gold standard.

By early 1937, the effects on the NSM, were already noticeable with orders coming in almost immediately. From the depth of 250 employees, it was back at 1,500 employees in February 1937. From a financial perspective the orders in progress in 1936 or concluded before the devaluation would not contribute much to profits, because many materials would have to be bought with a weak guilder. Indeed the profit over 1937 would be a meager 178,711 guilders (before depreciations), which was booked against earlier losses.

In 1938, the NSM finally had a normal year from a financial perspective. The result allowed a depreciation of 251,463 guilders, and a (real) profit of 133,988 guilders, which allowed a dividend of 5%. 1938 was also memorable for the launch of Oranje of 605.7 feet (184.6 m) and 20,017 GRT. In 1939, the operational result of the NSM almost doubled, and the company decided to build a fifth slipway. In the shareholders meeting of 25 April 1940, the board stated that this fifth slipway had a direct relation with the expected construction of battle cruisers, cf. the Design 1047 battlecruiser. Of the result of 683,555 guilders, most went to depreciation, in part to pay for a switch to electric welding. From the net profit of 133,990, a dividend of 5% was paid.

== World War II ==
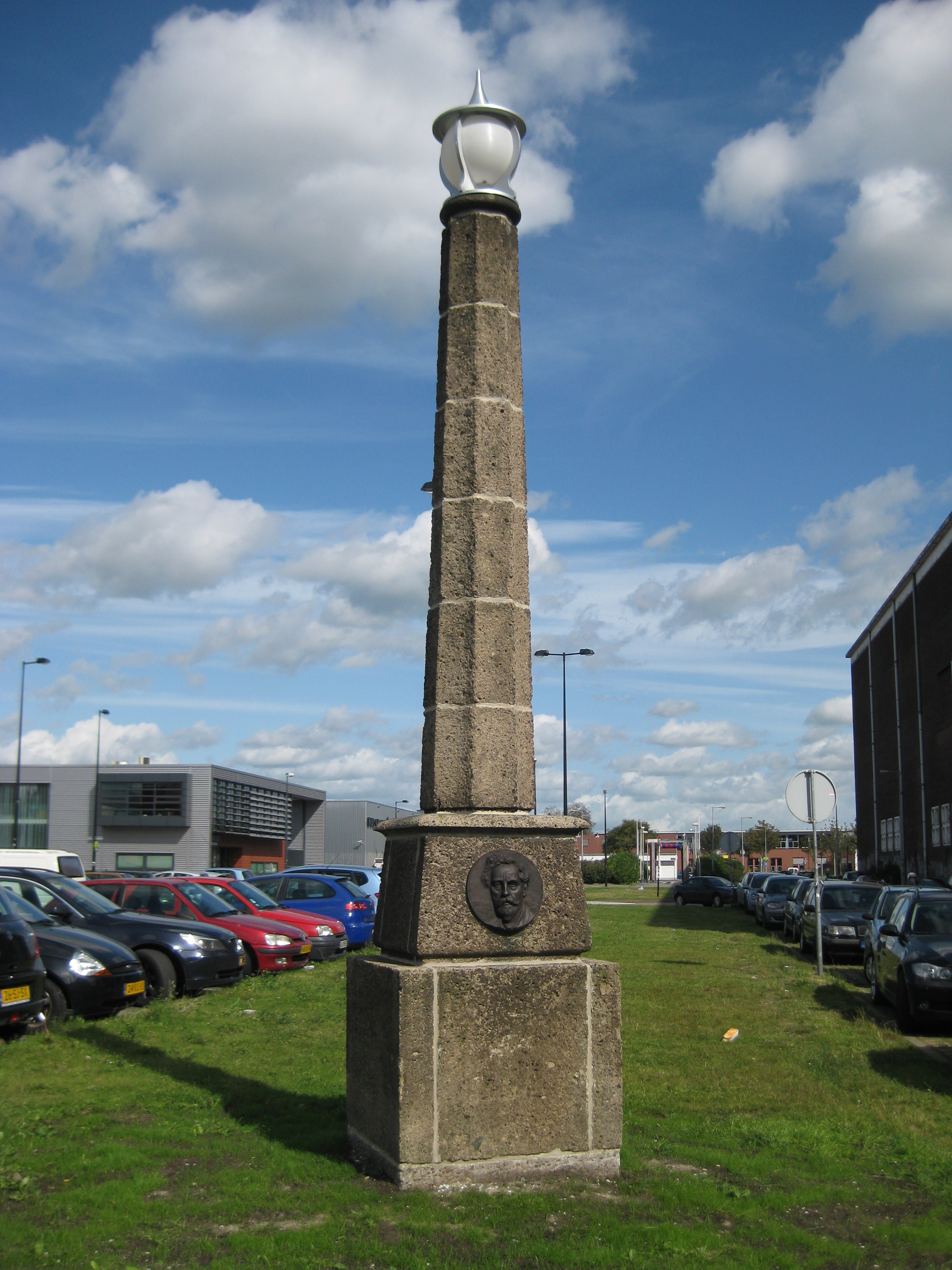
Needle of Goedkoop in 2011

For the NSM, World War II started with the escape of the light cruiser Jacob van Heemskerck from the shipyard to England. In the morning of 10 May, she was in her red primer, in the evening she was grey, and left for England without a single trial run of her engines. The NSM came through the war like many other companies, with strikes, mild collaboration, passive resistance delaying tactics and sabotage. The fact that the company had money and industrial means enabled it to help the resistance in many ways.

In August 1944, there was an extraordinary meeting of shareholders on account of the 50-year jubilee of the NSM. In it, Daan Goedkoop Dzn. quit as CEO and became a member of the supervisory board. He received a painted portrait by Bart Peizel and was succeeded by Piet Goedkoop. After some speeches the staff exited the offices and came outside, where thousands of employees were gathered. Here the memorial for Daniel Goedkoop Jr., who died in 1929, was revealed. It is now known as the 'Needle of Goedkoop'. The employees got a financial reward, and those who had been employed for over 10 years became shareholders.

In September 1944, the German occupiers started to destroy the shipyard as much as possible. The employees tried to prevent this, or to minimize the damage.

== Recovery and merger to NDSM ==
After the war, the total damage to the shipyard was estimated at 3,800,000 guilders. During the war, the fifth slipway had been completed. The quay that was used for finishing ships was expected to be operational by October 1945. A new crane that had been hidden during the war, and some repaired cranes would enable the shipyard to build some 4,000-ton ships within a few months. It was expected that by fall 1946, all slipways would be operational again. By January 1946, three overhead cranes were operational again. In January, the NSM also received an order for two tankers from Norway, which would be completely welded. In February, an order for two freighters for the Vereenigde Nederlandsche Scheepvaartmaatschappij followed.

In February 1946, the agreement to merge NSM and NDM became known. A public company Nederlandsche Dok en Scheepsbouw Maatschappij would be founded, and all assets transferred to this company called NDSM. On 27 February 1946, the shareholders of both companies agreed to the merger.
