= MS Christiaan Huygens =

Dutch ocean liner

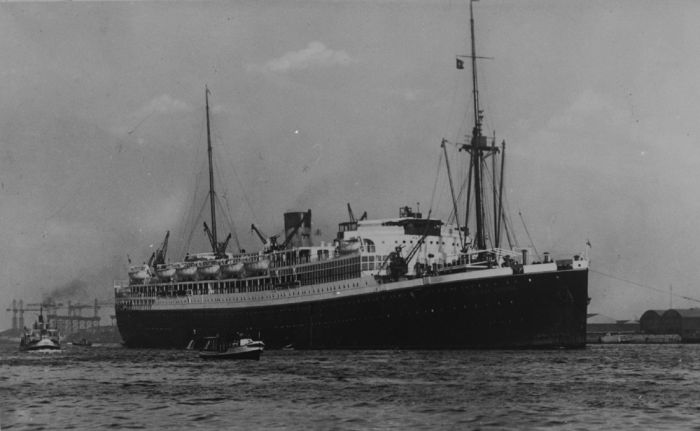

History

Netherlands
- Name: Christiaan Huygens
- Namesake: Christiaan Huygens
- Owner: Stoomvaart Maatschappij Nederland
- Operator: Stoomvaart Maatschappij Nederland; Orient Line (1940–45)
- Port of registry: Amsterdam (1927–40); Batavia (1940–44)^{[Note 1]}; Willemstad (1944–45)^{[Note 2]}
- Route: Amsterdam – Batavia (1928–39)
- Builder: NSM, Amsterdam
- Yard number: 186
- Laid down: 13 March 1926
- Launched: 28 September 1927
- Completed: December 1927
- Maiden voyage: 28 February 1928
- Out of service: 26 August 1945
- Identification: code letters NJWV (1927-34); call sign PDKD (1934-45)
- Fate: Struck a mine and broke in two 26 August 1945

General characteristics
- Type: Ocean liner, troopship
- Tonnage: 15,704 GRT, 9,319 NRT
- Length: 168.07 m (551.4 ft)
- Beam: 20.97 m (68.8 ft)
- Draught: 12.12 m (39 ft 9 in)
- Depth: 11.03 m (36.2 ft)
- Decks: 3
- Installed power: 2,490 NHP, 5,800 bhp
- Propulsion: 2 × screw propellers; 2 × two-stroke diesel engines
- Speed: 16 knots (30 km/h)
- Capacity: 638 passengers
- Troops: 3,178
- Crew: 230

Christiaan Huygens was a Dutch ocean liner that was built in 1927 by the Nederlandsche Scheepsbouw Maatschappij for the Stoomvaart Maatschappij Nederland (SMN). She was employed on the Amsterdam – Batavia route until the outbreak of the Second World War. Requisitioned as a troopship, she was employed in the Mediterranean Sea and Indian Ocean. Surviving the end of the war in Europe, she struck a mine in the Scheldt on 26 August 1945 and was beached. She broke in two on 5 September and was declared a total loss.

== Ordering and construction ==
The order for Christiaan Huygens became known in February 1926. Previously Stoomvaart Maatschappij Nederland (SMN) had ordered a comparable ocean liner, Pieter Corneliszoon Hooft from the French shipyard Ateliers et Chantiers de la Loire. The price offered was so advantageous that it fell outside the contractual limits up to which the Nederlandsche Scheepsbouw Maatschappij (NSM) was the preferred supplier for SMN. For Christiaan Huygens Stoomvaart Maatschappij Nederland did not get such an advantageous offer, and NSM offered to build her at a loss. Big delays in the construction of P.C. Hooft might also have been instrumental in securing the order for NSM, which was capable to deliver quickly.

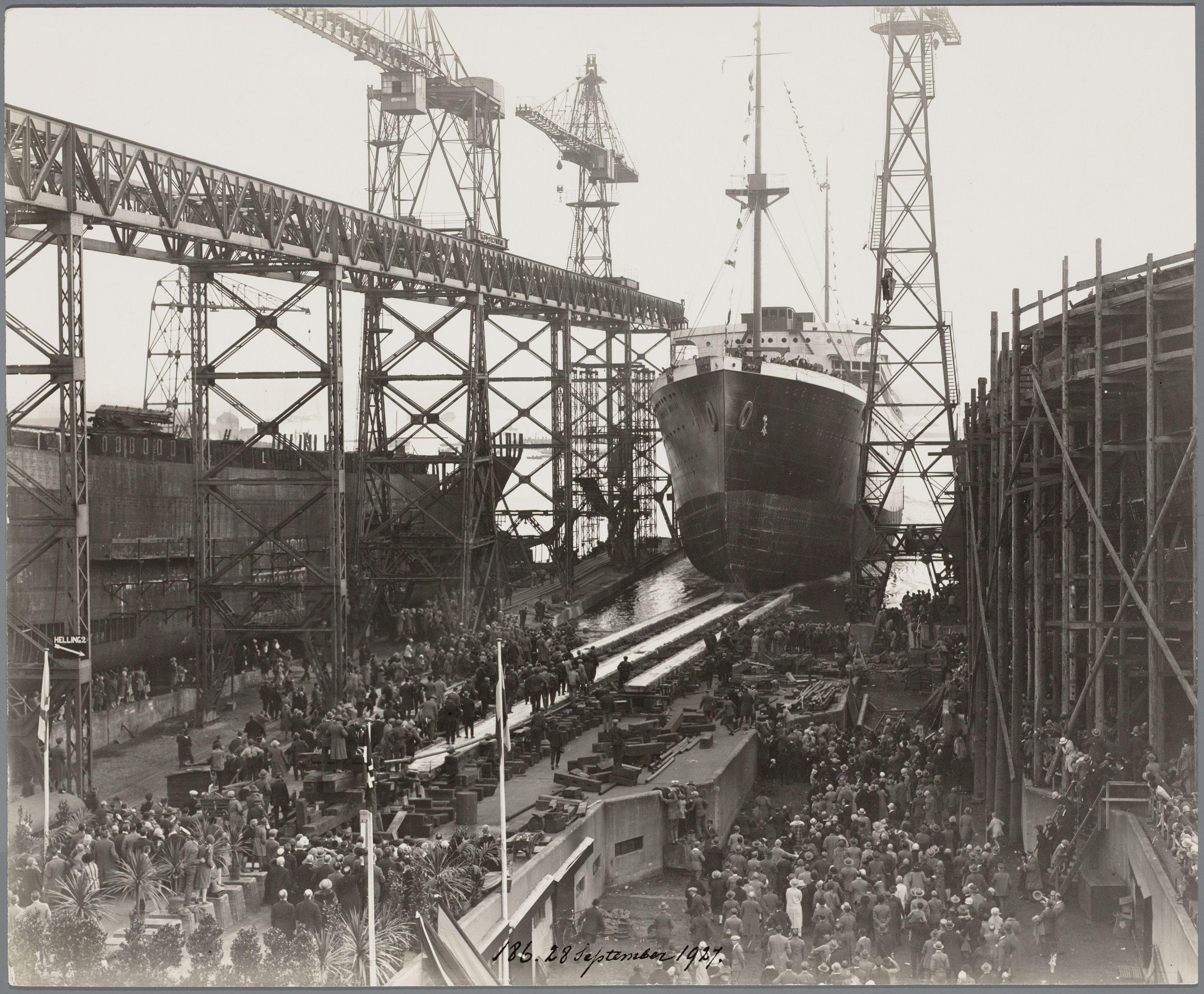
Launch of Christiaan Huygens

Christiaan Huygens was built as yard number 186 by the Nederlandsche Scheepsbouw Maatschappij, Amsterdam, North Holland, Netherlands. She was laid down on 13 March 1926. She was launched on 28 September 1927, the biggest ship built in the Netherlands up to that date. On 11 December 1927 she was towed from the NSM yard to the drydock Hendrik Dok of Amsterdamsche Droogdok Maatschappij, where the propellers were added.

On 25 January Christiaan Huygens left IJmuiden for her technical trials on the North Sea. These were finished with positive results on the 26th. Later on the 26th, a second 'official' trial run was made with about two hundred technicians, prominent people from the shipbuilding industry and journalists. During the trial, there was a dinner at which Mr. Tegelberg announced that MSN would accept delivery. Having delivered months ahead of schedule, Mr. D. Goedkoop CEO of the NSM yard created a laugh by remarking that: The most difficult part of building a ship is getting a contract that has a solid name under it. Really, construction itself is much easier. Almost immediately after the speedy delivery of Christiaan Huygens SMN ordered two much bigger ocean liners at NSM, Johan van Oldenbarnevelt and Marnix van Sint Aldegonde.

Christiaan Huygens was registered in Port of Amsterdam, and her code letters were NJWV. In 1934 they were superseded by the call sign PDKD.

== Description ==
=== Dimensions ===
The ship was 168.07 metres (551.4 ft) long, with a beam of 20.97 metres (68.8 ft). She had a depth of 11.03 metres (36.2 ft) and a draught of 12.12 metres (39 ft 9 in).

=== Machinery ===
The ship was powered by two ten-cylinder single cycle single-acting two-stroke diesel engines, They were rated at 2,490 nhp, 5,800 bhp. Each engine drove a single screw propeller, giving the ship a speed of 16 knots (30 km/h). The engines were built by Sulzer Brothers, Winterthur, Switzerland. They were model 10ST68 engines. Her auxiliary engines were three Sulzer 5S38 and a Sulzer 6RKH30 diesel engine, together rated at 2,250 bhp.

=== Accommodation ===
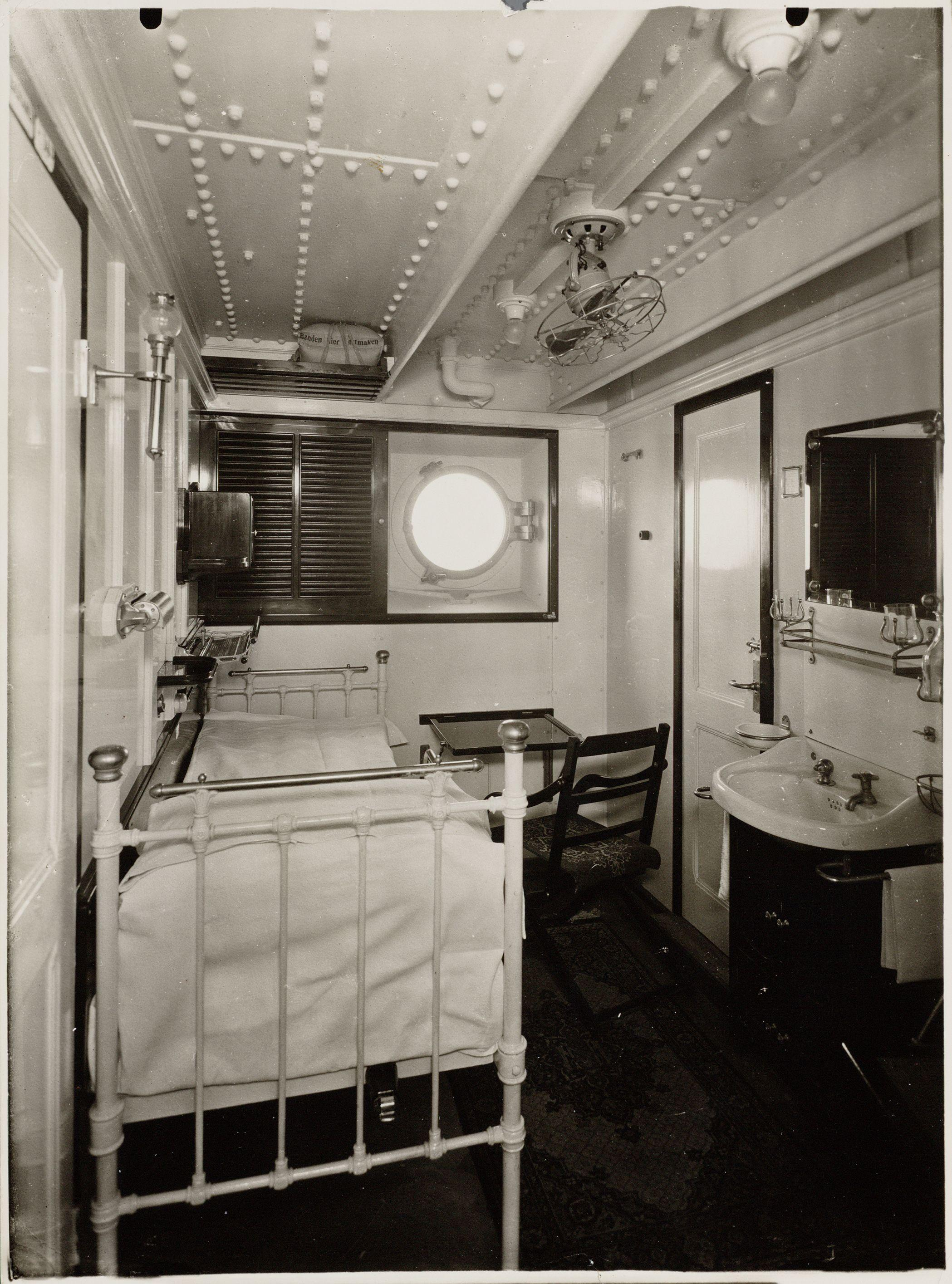
Second class cabin for one person

Accommodation for 638 passengers was provided. She had a crew of 230.

== Service as a passenger ship ==
Christiaan Huygens left Amsterdam on her maiden voyage on 28 February, bound for Batavia, Netherlands East Indies. She called at Southampton, Hampshire, United Kingdom on 1 March. She arrived at Batavia on 30 March, a day ahead of schedule. She left for Amsterdam on 18 April, arriving on 18 May, also a day ahead of schedule. On a voyage in November 1928, she arrived at Amsterdam three days ahead of schedule. On 13 August 1933, the Norwegian cargo ship Fernglen ran aground south of Cape Guardafui, Italian Somaliland. Christiaan Huygens was one of the vessels that went to her aid.

With the outbreak of the Second World War in 1939, Christiaan Huygens' route was altered, running between Genoa, Italy and Batavia.

== Service as a troopship ==
After the Netherlands had been occupied by Germany in 1940, Huygens port of registry was changed to Batavia. She was placed under the management of the Orient Line and served as a troopship. Carrying 1,290 troops, Christiaan Huygens sailed from Fremantle, Western Australia on 22 September with Convoy US 5, arriving at Suez, Egypt on 12 October. She sailed from Suez on 28 October 1940 as a member of Convoy SW 2A, which dispersed off Aden on 1 November. Her destination was Bombay, India. Christiaan Huygens left Bombay on 12 November with Convoy BN 8A, which arrived at Suez on 23 November. She then joined Convoy BN 9A, which sailed on 30 November and dispersed off her destination of Aden on 5 December.

Christiaan Huygens then sailed to Colombo, Ceylon, from where she left on 16 January 1941 with Convoy US 8, which arrived at Suez on 28 January. She left on 17 February as a member of Convoy BSF 2, which dispersed at sea on 22 February. On 5 April, she joined Convoy SL 70, which had left Freetown, Sierra Leone on 29 March. At the time, she was carrying maize and personnel. She detached from the convoy on 20 April. Christiaan Huygens later reached the River Clyde, United Kingdom. Carrying 1,592 troops, she sailed from the Clyde on 22 May 1941 as a member of Convoy WS 8B. The convoy arrived at Freetown on 4 June. She sailed 20 June and joined Convoy WS 9A, which had left Oversay, Renfrewshire, United Kingdom on 3 June. She left the convoy at Durban, South Africa. Her movements are unknown until 13 November 1941, when she left Halifax, Nova Scotia, Canada as a member of Convoy TC 15, which arrived at the Clyde on 21 November.

Carrying 1,575 troops, Christaan Huygens sailed on 12 January 1942 as part of Convoy WS 15. On 16 January, Llangibby Castle was attacked by U-402 and damaged. The convoy arrived at Freetown on 25 January. Having called at Cape Town, South Africa, the convoy reached Durban on 13 February. Carrying 1,475 troops, Christiaan Huygens left on 19 February as part of Convoy DM 3. The convoy was bound for Singapore, but during the voyage Singapore fell to the Japanese. The convoy's destination was changed, first to Batavia, then to Colombo and finally to Bombay as the Japanese advanced across south east Asia. The convoy arrived at Bombay on 6 March. Christiaan Huygens subsequently returned to the Clyde. Carrying 2,670 troops, she left on 1 June with Convoy WS 19P, arriving at Freetown on 15 June. She then joined Convoy WS 19PA, which formed at sea on 17 July and dispersed off Aden on 26 July. Her movements are unknown until 14 November, when Christiaan Huygens left the Clyde with Convoy KMF 3, which arrived at Algiers, Algeria on 23 November. She returned with Convoy MKF 3, which sailed that day and arrived at the Clyde on 3 December.

Christiaan Huygens was a member of Convoy WS 27, which left Liverpool, England on 24 February 1943 and arrived at Freetown on 8 March. She subsequently sailed to Aden, from where she left on 30 March with Convoy MC 6, which arrived at Durban on 13 April. She sailed on 25 April as a member of Convoy CM 41, arriving at Bombay on 11 May. Her movements are unknown until 11 July when Christiaan Huygens sailed from Port Said with Convoy MWF 36 in support of Operation Husky. The convoy arrived at Sicily, Italy on 10 July. Malta with Convoy MEF 36. On 13 July, she was in collision with the Polish troopship Batory. The convoy arrived at Port Said, Egypt on 15 July. She then sailed to Algiers, from where she left to join Convoy MKF 22, which had sailed from Port Said on 19 August and arrived at the Clyde on 9 September. Christiaan Huygens sailed from the Clyde on 21 September with Convoy TU 2, which arrived at New York, United States on 30 September. Carrying general cargo and troops, she sailed from New York on 29 December as a member of Convoy UT 6, arriving at the Clyde on 8 January 1944.

In 1944, her port of registry was changed to Willemstad. Carrying 1,837 troops, Christiaan Huygens left the Clyde on 15 January with Convoy KMF 28, which arrived at Port Said on 30 January. She left the convoy at Algiers. Carrying 2,967 troops, she returned with Convoy MKF 28, which had left Port Said on 20 January and arrived at the Clyde on 2 February. Carrying 2,637 troops, she left the Clyde on 29 March with Convoy KMF 30, arriving at Port Said on 12 April. She then sailed to Oran, Algeria, from where she left on 17 April as a member of Convoy NSF 20, which arrived at Naples, Italy on 20 April. She left the next day with Convoy SNF 20, arriving at Oran on 24 April. Christiaan Huygens sailed with Convoy NSF 21 on 30 April, arriving back at Naples on 3 May. She then sailed to Taranto, Ital. She left with Convoy IXF 14 on 5 May for Port Said, where she arrived four days later. A total of 2,499 personnel were embarked before she left with Convoy MKF 31, which arrived at Liverpool on 29 May. Christiaan Huygens sailed from the Clyde on 24 August as a member of Convoy KMF 34. She had 3,168 troops embarked. Her destination was Naples, where 1,7416 troops embarked and 3,755 sacks of mail were loaded. She then sailed to join Convoy MKF 34, which had left Port Said on 3 September and arrived at Liverpool on 14 September. Christiaan Huygens sailed with Convoy KMF 36 on 6 November. She was carrying 2,740 troops. The convoy arrived at Alexandria, Egypt on 19 November. She sailed on to her destination of Trincomalee, Ceylon. From there, she sailed to Aden, from where she left on 28 November as a member of Convoy ABF 6, which arrived at Bombay on 4 December. Escorted by HMS Tyne, she detached from Convoy ABF 6 on 1 December. The two ships formed Convoy AJ 6, which arrived at Colombo on 5 December. Forming Convoy JA 1 on her own, Christiaan Huygens left Colombo on 11 December and arrived at Aden on 17 December. She then sailed to Gibraltar.

Christiaan Huygens sailed with Convoy MKF 37 on 1 January 1945, arriving at Liverpool on 6 January. Carrying 2,916 troops, she sailed with Convoy KMF 40 on 18 February, arriving at Gibraltar on 24 February. She sailed on 6 March with Convoy MKF 40, which arrived at Liverpool on 12 March. She then sailed to the Clyde to join her final convoy, KMF 43. Carrying 2,658 troops, she sailed on 17 April and arrived at Gibraltar on 23 April. Her final destination was Bombay. On 26 August, while on the way from Antwerp to Rotterdam, she struck a mine in the Scheldt (51°37′N 03°17′E) and was beached at the Zuid-Steenbank. The ship broke in two on 6 September and was declared a total loss.

== Notes ==
1. Registered under the Dutch flag although Batavia was then part of the Dutch colony Netherlands East Indies.
2. Registered under the Dutch flag, although Willemstad was then in the Dutch colony Territory of Curaçao.
