= MS Marnix van Sint Aldegonde =

Coordinates: 37°7′N 6°37′E

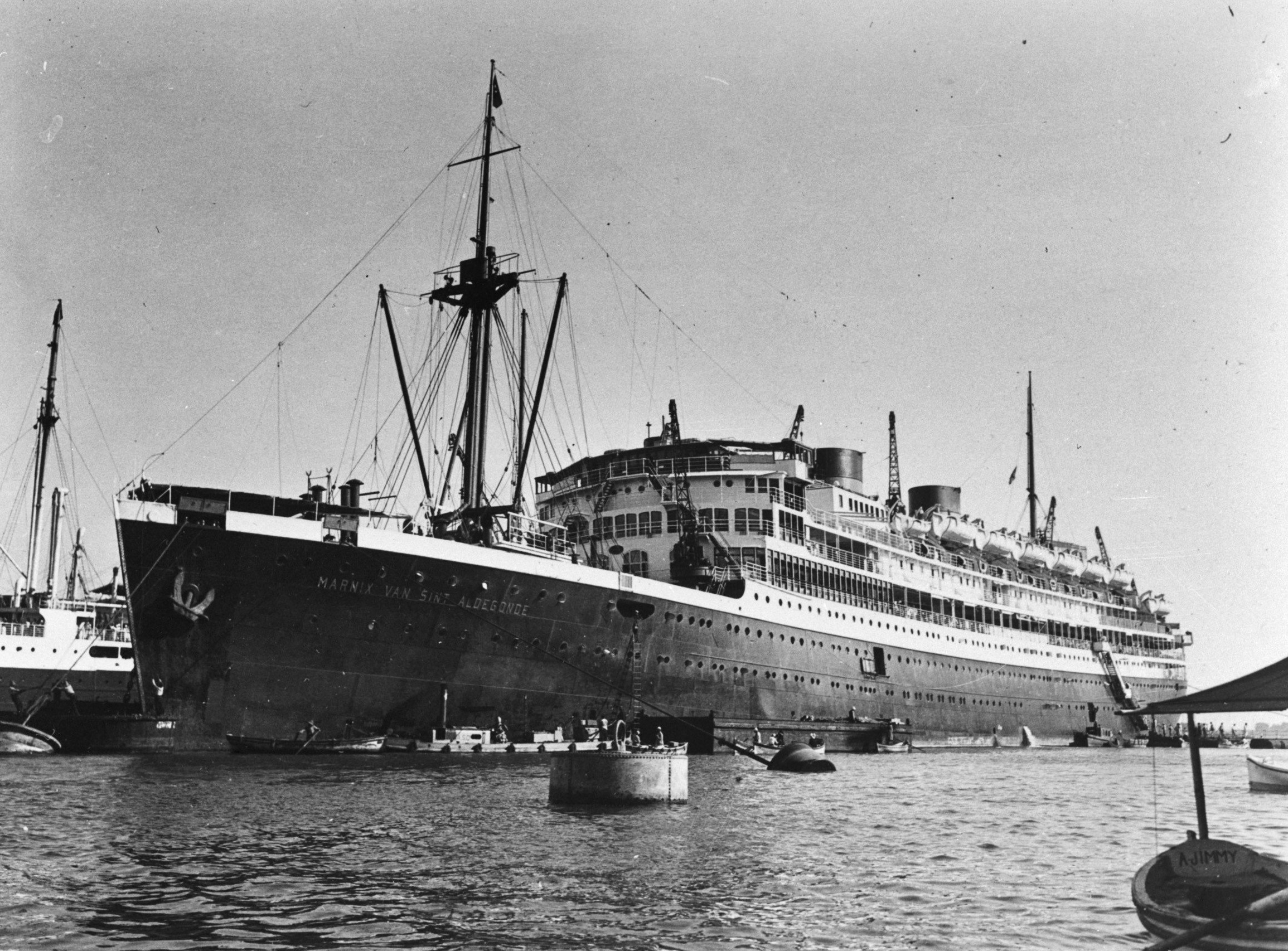
- Marnix van Sint Aldegonde at Port Said

History

Netherlands
- Name: Marnix van Sint Aldegonde
- Namesake: Philips of Marnix, Lord of Saint-Aldegonde
- Owner: Netherland Line
- Builder: NSM, Amsterdam
- Yard number: 195
- Laid down: 8 December 1928
- Launched: 21 December 1929
- Completed: 12 September 1930
- Identification: Code letters PLJN (until 1933); Call sign PFVA (1934 onward)
- Fate: Sunk by air attack 7 November 1943

General characteristics
- Tonnage: 19,129 GRT, 11,404 NRT, 10,879 DWT
- Length: 586.2 ft (178.7 m)
- Beam: 74.8 ft (22.8 m)
- Draught: 39 ft 4 in (11.98 m)
- Depth: 36.0 ft (11.0 m)
- Decks: 4
- Installed power: 3,100 NHP, 14,000 bhp (10,000 kW)
- Propulsion: 2 × two-stroke diesel engines; 2 × screws
- Speed: 19 knots (35 km/h) top speed; 17 knots (31 km/h) cruising speed
- Capacity: 720 passengers; 9,000 tonnes
- Troops: 2,924
- Crew: 361 (peacetime); 278 crew + 33 DEMS gunners (as troop ship)
- Sensors & processing systems: submarine signalling, wireless direction finding
- Armament: (1943): 1 × 3 in (76 mm) 12-pounder gun; 2 × 40 mm (1.6 in) Bofors guns; 2 × 20 mm (0.79 in) Oerlikon guns; 16 × Unrotated Projectile launchers

MS Marnix van Sint Aldegonde was a Netherland Line luxury passenger ship and cargo liner built in 1930 for service between Amsterdam and Jakarta. She operated out of Surabaya from 21 February 1940, and was requisitioned as a troopship at Singapore in May 1941 to transport Australian troops from Melbourne to Asia and Africa, and to bring 1,000 Italian prisoners of war from Egypt to Mumbai. She left the Indian Ocean in 1942, and subsequently carried Allied troops for Operation Torch, Operation Husky, and Operation Avalanche. Her Master, H.W. Hettema, was awarded the Distinguished Service Cross in January 1943 after his ship destroyed two attacking bombers off North Africa on 9 November 1942.

== Loss ==
Approximate position of Marnix van Sint Aldegonde when hit by a torpedo off the coast of Algeria

Marnix van Sint Aldegonde sailed with convoy KMF 25 on 27 October 1943. She was attacked by Kampfgeschwader 26 Dornier 217 torpedo bombers after entering the Mediterranean; and was hit by a torpedo which flooded the engine room on the evening of 6 November 1943. All personnel were rescued by other ships, and Marnix van Sint Aldegonde was taken in tow. The Grace Liner Santa Elena had been similarly disabled by another torpedo in the same attack; and was also taken in tow. The two ships collided while in tow, and both sank from progressive flooding the next evening.

== Bibliography ==
- Lloyd's Register of Shipping (PDF). Vol. II.–Steamers and Motorships of 300 Tons and Over. London: Lloyd's Register of Shipping. 1930 – via Southampton City Council.
- Lloyd's Register of Shipping (PDF). Vol. I.–Steamers and Motorships of 300 Tons and Over. London: Lloyd's Register of Shipping. 1934 – via Southampton City Council.
