= MS Sinfra =

Cargo ship sunk during World War II

- Fernglen in 1929

History
- Name: Fernglen (1929–1934); Sandhamn (1934–1939); Sinfra (1939–1943)
- Namesake: Sandhamn, Sweden; Sinfra, Ivory Coast
- Owner: A/S Glittre (1929–1934); Rederi A/B Jamaica (1934–1939); Cie Generale de Nav a Vapeur Cyprien; Fabre (1939–42); German government (1942–1943)
- Operator: Mittelmeer Reederei GmbH (1942–1943)
- Port of registry: Oslo, Norway (1929–1934); Stockholm, Sweden (1934–1939); Marseille, France (1939–1942); Germany (1942–1943)
- Route: Fern Line (1929–1934)
- Builder: Akers Mekaniske Verksted, Oslo, Norway
- Yard number: 434
- Launched: 15 May 1929
- Completed: July 1929
- Identification: Code letters: LHKB (1930–34); SEVA (1934–39)
- Fate: Sunk by air attack 19 October 1943

General characteristics
- Tonnage: As built: 4,444 GRT; 2,669 NRT; 8,190 DWT; 3,992 tons under deck; After 1934: 4,470 GRT; 2,577 NRT; 3,979 tons under deck
- Length: 117.4 m (385 ft)
- Beam: 16.7 m (55 ft)
- Depth: 7 metres (23 ft)
- Decks: 2
- Installed power: 624 nominal horsepower
- Propulsion: 2 6-cylinder 4S.C.SA diesel engines, twin screw propellers
- Speed: 12.5 knots (23.2 km/h)

Sinfra was a cargo ship built in 1929 as Fernglen by Akers Mekaniske Verksted in Oslo, Norway, for a Norwegian shipping company. The ship was sold to Swedish owners in 1934 and to a French company in 1939, on the last occasion having her name changed to Sinfra.

Sinfra was confiscated by the German occupation authorities in 1942, and used by them in the Mediterranean. On 19 October 1943, Sinfra was bombed and sunk by Allied aircraft north of Souda Bay, Crete. Around 2,000 people were killed in the sinking, the majority being Italian POWs of Germany, including many killed by the German guards on the ship during the attack.

== Description ==
The vessel was a 4,444 GRT (2,669 NRT, 8,190 DWT, tonnage under deck: 3,992) steel-hulled cargo ship, built in 1929 by the shipyard Akers Mekaniske Verksted in Oslo, Norway, as Fernglen. She had yard number 434.

The ship was 117.4 metres (385 ft) long, with a beam of 16.7 metres (55 ft) and a depth of 7 metres (23 ft). She had electric lighting, wireless telegraph and two decks. The ship was propelled by two 6-cylinder 4S.C.SA diesel engines with a combined total of 624 horsepower (465 kW), which gave her a top speed of 12.5 knots (23.2 km/h). Each of the engines, also built by Akers Mekaniske Verksted, powered a screw propeller.

== History ==
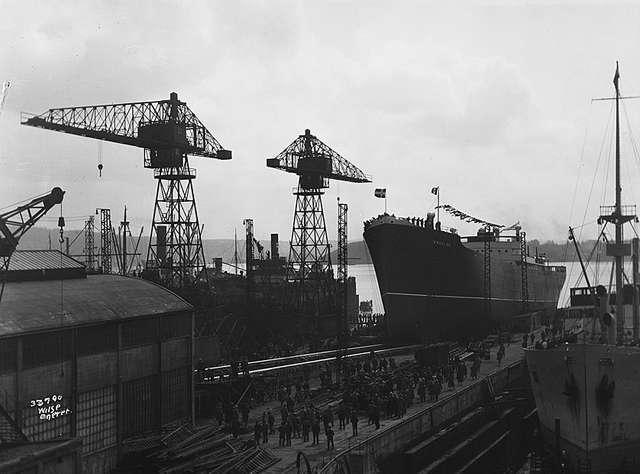
Fernglen being launched at Akers Mekaniske Verksted in 1929

Fernglen was built for A/S Glittre of Oslo, Norway (a subsidiary of the shipping company Fearnley & Eger), at Akers Mekaniske Verksted. She was launched on 15 May 1929, completed in July of the same year, and assigned the code letters LHKB. During construction, Norwegian painter Thorolf Holmboe visited the shipyard and rendered the maritime painting To skip i flytedokk ved Akers Mek. Verksted, which also captured the Fred. Olsen & Co. cargo ship Borgå undergoing maintenance in the neighbouring floating dry dock. (Note: As of 1999, the painting was owned by the Norwegian Shipowners' Association.)

Fernglen was one of nine ships belonging to Fearnley & Eger that formed the "Fern Line". (Note: The other ships employed on the Fern Line concurrently with Fernglen were Fernbank, Ferncliff, Ferndale, Fernhill, Fernlane, Fernmoor, Fernwood and Fernbrook.) The Fern Line ships were employed primarily in the cargo trade, carrying phosphate and cotton to Japan, then sailing from the Philippines to the United States with copra.

On 13 August 1933, she ran aground 30 nautical miles (56 km) south of Cape Guardafui, Italian Somaliland, while on a voyage from Macassar, Netherlands East Indies, to Aarhus, Denmark, with a load of 7,422 tons of copra. The British tug Preserver and the Dutch passenger ship Christiaan Huygens went to her aid. The British tug Protector was sent from Suez, Egypt, on 22 August to assist Preserver. Fernglen was refloated on 8 November and taken in to Ras Alula, Italian Somaliland, for examination. The necessity of discharging her cargo by hand was the main factor in the delay in refloating her. The damage caused by the grounding was such that the ship was considered beyond economic repair. (Note: In order to replace Fernglen, Fearnley & Eger ordered a new ship, also named Fernglen, from a Swedish shipyard.) The refloated wreck was towed to Rotterdam in the Netherlands.

In 1934 Fernglen was nevertheless sold to the Stockholm-based company Rederi A/B Jamaica, repaired and renamed Sandhamn. The repairs and rebuild work on the ship was carried out at Öresundsvarvet at Landskrona and entailed the replacement of 600 tons of steel and the complete disassembly and refurbishing of the ship's machinery. Öresund Shipyard's work on rebuilding the ship was one of the largest hull repair jobs ever carried out in Sweden at the time. The rebuilding was completed on 5 December 1934. The ship's tonnage had been changed to 4,470 GRT (2,577 NRT, tonnage under deck: 3,979). The vessel was assigned the code letters SEVA. Rederi Jamaica employed Sandhamn on trade lines abroad. In 1939 she was sold on to Cie Generale de Nav a Vapeur Cyprien Fabre of Marseille, France. The new French owners renamed her Sinfra.

In December 1942, the German occupation authorities confiscated the ship, but retained its French name. Management was transferred to the German semi-public Mittelmeer-Reederei, which oversaw all civilian ships confiscated by the Germans in the Mediterranean.

=== Transporting prisoners of war ===
The Greek island of Crete had been captured by the Germans and Italians in the Battle of Crete in May 1941 and was occupied by a mixed German-Italian force. The Italian garrison unit was the 51st Siena Infantry Division, consisting of 21,700 men, which occupied the easternmost prefecture of Lasithi.

On 8 September 1943 the Armistice between Italy and Allied armed forces was signed, and the Italians in Crete and elsewhere were disarmed by the Germans without major resistance. As elsewhere, they were given the choice to continue the war alongside Germany or to be sent to the Reich to perform forced labour. The Germans employed ships to transport Italian prisoners in the Mediterranean. Of these a dozen were lost, causing the deaths of at least 13,000 prisoners in total.

A minority of the Italian soldiers on Crete chose to continue the fight on the German side and formed the Legione Italiana Volontaria Creta.

=== Sinking ===
On 18 October 1943, 2,389 Italian prisoners, including 155 officers, were loaded into the cargo hold of Sinfra to be transported to Piraeus on the Greek mainland. There were 204 Germans on board, as well as a cargo of bombs. Less than an hour after departing Souda Bay, accompanied by the escort vessels GK 05 and GK 06, the ship came under Allied air attack. A total of ten USAAF North American B-25 Mitchell and RAF Bristol Beaufighter aircraft engaged the ship, some 19 nautical miles (35 km) north of Souda Bay. At 22:05, after nightfall, Sinfra was struck by a torpedo near the front hatch, and at 23:00 the ship was hit by a bomb that penetrated the engine room. The hits knocked out the ship's steering and set Sinfra on fire. At 02:31 on 19 October, the ship blew up and sank. The number of dead is disputed, with estimates ranging from 1,857 or 2,098 killed, up to 5,000 dead. Amongst the survivors were 597 Italians, 197 Germans and 13 Greeks. Most of those who died were Italian POWs. Some 3% of the Germans on board died in the sinking, while according to conservative estimates close to 77% of the Italians perished.

The ship had insufficient safety equipment for the number of people on board. In addition to the two escort vessels, eleven other German vessels responded to the SOS signals sent out by Sinfra. The rescue vessels were under orders to prioritize the rescue of Germans. While rescue efforts were going on, a No. 603 Squadron RAF Bristol Beaufighter strafed a German Dornier Do 24 flying boat which was participating in the rescue. The Do 24 later sank. As Sinfra burned, the German guards on board locked the prisoners in the holds and threw hand grenades at them. When the panicking surviving prisoners broke out of the holds and charged the guards, attempting to board life boats, the guards opened fire with small arms and machine guns, killing many. According to Italian naval archives, some 500 Italians were rescued from the sinking ship, but after the survivors had been brought to Chania, Crete, about half of them were executed by the Germans "for undisciplined behaviour ... and the killing of guards" during the sinking.

== Bibliography ==
- Alnæs, Karsten (1999). Historien om Norge (in Norwegian). Vol. 4: En ny arbeidsdag. Oslo: Gyldendal. ISBN 8205230315.
- de Jong, Peter (2015). Dornier Do 24 Units. Oxford: Osprey Publishing. ISBN 978-1-4728-0570-6.
- Grøtvedt, Paul (1999). For fulle seil: marinemaleriet i norsk billedkunst (in Norwegian). Oslo: Stenersens forl. ISBN 8272012588.
- Schreiber, Gerhard (1990). Die italienischen Militärinternierten im deutschen Machtbereich 1943–1945: Verachtet – verraten – vergessen (in German). Munich: R. Oldenbourg Verlag GmbH. ISBN 3-486-55391-7.
- Wasberg, Gunnar Christie (1971). Fearnley & Eger 1869–1969 (in Norwegian). Oslo: Dreyer.
- Williams, David L. (2012). In the Shadow of the Titanic: Merchant Ships Lost With Greater Fatalities. Brimscombe: The History Press. ISBN 9780752477138.
