= Amsterdam Wooden Drydock I =

First floating dry dock of Amsterdam

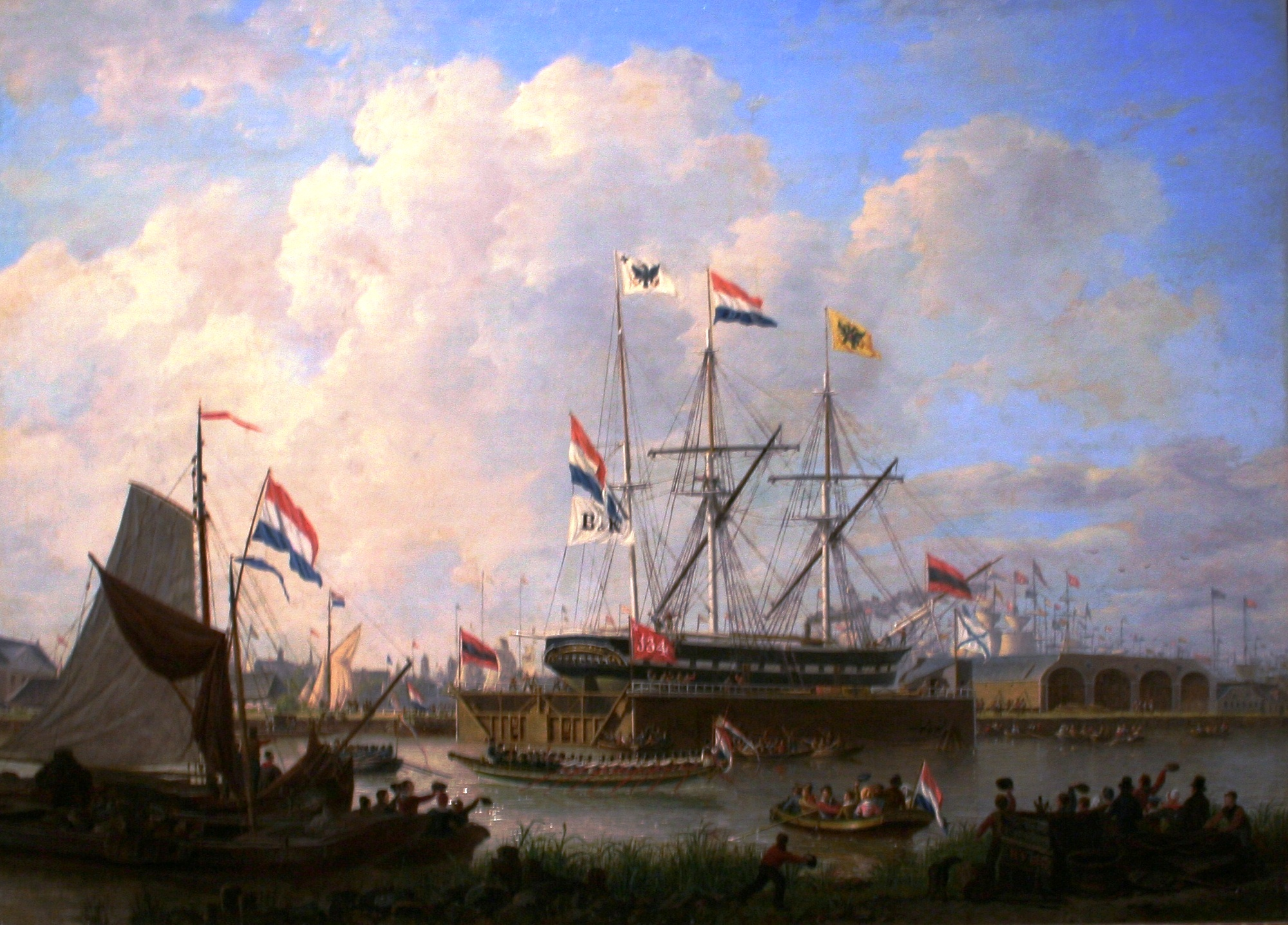
- The first Amsterdam dry dock in 1843

History

Netherlands
- Name: Amsterdam Wooden Drydock I
- Ordered: May 1842 or before
- Builder: J.R. Boelen en Zonen
- Launched: 6 August 1842
- Commissioned: 23 November 1842
- Home port: Amsterdam; 52.375239°N 4.919179°E

General characteristics (as completed)
- Length: 48.13 m (157.9 ft)
- Beam: 18.68 m (61.3 ft)
- Draft: 0.57 m (1.9 ft) (empty)
- Depth of hold: 6.23 m (20.4 ft)

Amsterdam Wooden Drydock I (Dutch: Het eerste drijvende droogdok in Amsterdam) was the first floating dry dock of Amsterdam, and probably the first modern floating dry dock of Europe.

== Context ==
=== Dry docks for commercial sailing ships ===
In the eighteenth century, the effectiveness of dry-docking for warships was well-known. In the late eighteenth and early nineteenth century, this also became applicable to commercial ships. This was especially true for ships sailing to the tropics. These were often coppered, which made regular inspection and repair in a dry dock even more useful. When Dutch shipping revived after 1815, many Dutch merchant ships were coppered. This was of course especially the case in Amsterdam, where most of the ships sailing to the Indies belonged. This is how people in Amsterdam got the idea to create a facility for repairing ships without careening, like Rotterdam, Den Helder, Vlissingen and Hellevoetsluis had.

=== The weak underground of Holland ===
So, Amsterdam wanted to have a dry dock, and its merchants had the means to build one. However, experiences with building a graving dock had been disheartening. Vlissingen Navy Drydock had seen so much trouble, that it had been out of service for 92 years. Hellevoetsluis Dry Dock had been successful, but the Willemsoord Dry Dock near Den Helder was in serious trouble from 1838 onwards.

For Amsterdam the scenario of a graving dock was predictable. The marshy grounds of the city were so weak that all houses had been built by driving piles till they hit solid ground. This was and is quite effective, but it proved a shaky solution for the massive pressures that a graving dock faced.

== Design and Ordering ==
=== American floating dry docks ===
The first modern floating dry dock started to operate in New York in 1839-1840. It had been constructed by John S. Gilbert (1801-1891), inventor of the balance dry dock.

The American dry dock drew the attention of Jan Daniel Diets, ex-captain of ships to the West Indies. He bought the plans of the American floating dry dock via Gilbert's agent John G. Cushman, commander of the ship Francia. Diets had to make a choice between either buying the plans unseen for 12,000 guilders, excluding the patent cost, or to have Cushman request the patent for himself. Diets decided to take the risk. On 16 December 1841 the invention was patented in the Netherlands by John S. Gilbert, domiciled at the address of J.W. van den Broek consul of the United States in Amsterdam. Diets got a license for exclusive use in Amsterdam for 5 years.

=== The shipping line Reederij der Drijvende Droogdokken is founded ===
A shipping line was then founded to build and run the dry dock. This company was (at least later on) known as Reederij van de Drijvende Droogdokken (shipping line of the floating drydocks). Its participants were a number of shipping lines in Amsterdam, which held shares. The supervisory board was formed by: Mayor Pieter Huidekoper; Jonkheer Pieter Hartsen shipping line owner and president of the chamber of commerce; Jean Pierre Janette Walen, shipping line owner; and Pieter Constantyn Gulcher insurer. Jan Daniel Diets became administrator.

On 31 December 1846 J.D. Diets, acting on behalf of the board, convened a meeting of participating shipping line owners on 18 January 1847. The meeting was to take place in the Doelen on Garnalenmarkt, and to name a replacement for the deceased Jonkheer Pieter Hartsen. On 24 February 1847 the Reederij der Drijvende Droogdokken obtained a prolongation of its license of 16 December 1841 till the end of 1849.

In 1851 the two dry docks in the Oosterdok and the drydock in the Westerdok together serviced 148 ships, totaling 72,000 tons. In 1862 this was 222 ships for 84,286 ton. In 1863 232 ships totaling 86,387 ton, and in 1864 235 ships totaling 92,096 tons.

The Reederij der Drijvende Droogdokken would go into decline for several reasons. The primary reason was that the Oosterdok, where the company had three of her dry docks, went into decline from the mid-1870s. In 1874 a railway bridge had been constructed over its entrance. In spite of all insurances, this soon proved bad news for the usefulness of the Oosterdok. For the company, this was extra problematic, because it could not move its dry docks out of the wet docks Westerdok and Oosterdok. Till 1909, the Oosterdok lock was 50 feet wide, and the dry docks were 60 feet wide. When the lock was removed in 1909, the railway bridge remained, and though it was wider than the former lock, it was still not wide enough to move the docks. The second reason is that from the opening of the North Sea Canal in 1876, the ships that visited Amsterdam became bigger. These could not pass the Oosterdok Lock while loaded. The third reason for the decline was that competing companies invested in dry docks on the IJ, outside the wet docks. These were also able to handle the big ships.

In 1880 163 ships, totaling 62.984 tons used the dry docks. In 1881 this was 183 ships totaling 57,846 ton, and in 1882 196 ships for 67,311 ton. In 1885 the price of the shares dropped dramatically to about 25% of the nominal value.

On 8 March 1889 a proposal for liquidation was brought forward in the meeting of shareholders. On 16 June 1890 the company auctioned its dry dock in the Westerdok for break up. In 1891 112 ships were docked in the three remaining dry docks. In 1892, this was 102. On 6 January 1902 Reederij der Drijvende Droogdokken auctioned its three wooden dry docks moored in the Oosterdok. These were: a dry dock of 65 * 19 * 6.25 m; a dry dock of 61 * 19 * 6.25 m and a dry dock of 50 * 19 * 5.85 m.

=== De Droogdokken in het Oosterdok NV ===
The three dry docks in the Oosterdok were bought by H. Schutte, who would continue the business for some time. The price was 24,900 guilders. On 20 March 1902 he founded the public company De Droogdokken in het Oosterdok NV, with a capital of only 50,000 guilders. In 1919 Hera owned the company, which still owned the three dry docks. In 1922 the usage of the dry docks was very minimal, due to the slump in shipping. In 1923 the dry docks did not have enough profitable work for much of the year. In 1924 the usage was still insufficient to be profitable. In 1925 the activities of Droogdokken in het Oosterdok NV were still not profitable. On 9 June 1926 the shareholders decided to liquidate Hera.

After the liquidation of Hera, the shareholders of Droogdokken in het Oosterdok NV, had to decide about their company. On 27 August 1926 there was an extraordinary meeting of shareholders of Droogdokken in het Oosterdok NV. On 21 December 1927 the company was in liquidation.

The dry docks would nevertheless remain known as Hera Docks for some time. In 1928 an accident happened in one of the Hera docks. In 1930 there was an accident near the Hera dry dock. In 1935 a large ship passed the wooden docks. In May 1938 there was a fire in the Hera dock on the Mariniersplein. On 27 August 1940 Hera droogdokken NV was liquidated.

In March 1951 somebody visited the Amsterdamsche Droogdok Maatschappij, and saw the oldest dock of the ADM, the wooden dry dock that would become 75 years old in 1952. It meant that this dock dated from 1877, and was not one of the first four wooden dry docks.

== Characteristics ==
=== General characteristics ===
Wooden floating dry docks were very different from the later floating iron dry docks. The main difference is that wooden drydocks were basically rafts that were lowered by pumping water in and out of the superstructure on the sides. Once the sides were empty the natural flotation power of the raft kicked in. Engineer van Oordt gave a description of the third floating dry dock in Amsterdam.

=== Raft and sides ===
The bottom of the dock was a raft. According to the plan it was to be made of pine planks that were 60 cm longer than the total beam of the dock, so they would not split from nails and bolts. The thickness of the planks was to be 30 cm. The planks were made out of so-called 70 feet pines, which were 52–56 cm wide in the middle. These planks were placed alternating, so the end of a plank that came from the top of a tree, would be next to the end of a plank that came from the bottom of a tree. All this was fixed together with small timber. Over this bottom came a pine floor. The planks of the floor were 28 cm wide and 20 cm thick. The length of these planks varied from 10–20 m. The openings between these planks were 3 cm wide, starting 11 cm from the top, and were filled with moss. On the surface, the seams were caulked shut. A third layer of 31-cm-thick planks was laid on top of this, in the same direction as the pines of the first layer. Water that came between these layers was led to the pumps, so it would not make the floor of the dock wet. On top of the first layer, was placed a watertight rectangle of 30 cm wide, which protected the 2nd and 3rd layers.

From the outside of the raft the sides went up straight. For this Narva beams of 28 by 30 cm were used (Dutch: Nerva Balken), obviously a special kind of wood. On the outside these were straightened in order to be able to attach the planks on the exterior. On the inside these beams were left rough. On the inside of the dock these Narva beams went up from the floor with angle of about 56 degrees. This is how the water 'chests' were formed. Near the stern of the dock the diagonal beams were made somewhat thicker and made of oak. Up till about 1 m above the raft, the dock was made watertight with 20 cm thick planks. Further above, the planks were made of scots pine and diminished to 19 and 8 cm thickness. Oordt noted that the dock was so watertight that a ship once docked for 19 days without the dock having to use the pumps.

On the inside, the sides or chests were divided into four compartments each. In the bow was a box called "pump head" where pumps were placed at 2.40 m above the floor of the dock. Water could be pumped out of the rear compartments separately. Water could flow from the compartments into the dock and vice versa. The openings regulated by valves. Water could also flow from the outside to the compartments. These openings could be closed by a wooden plug. At the stern, the dry dock had a large trapezium form door. In this door were two openings of 55 cm square. One was at the bottom, the other 60 cm higher. This higher opening was used to get goods in and out. It was noted that even with the heaviest ships, the water on the outside was never so high.

=== Operation ===
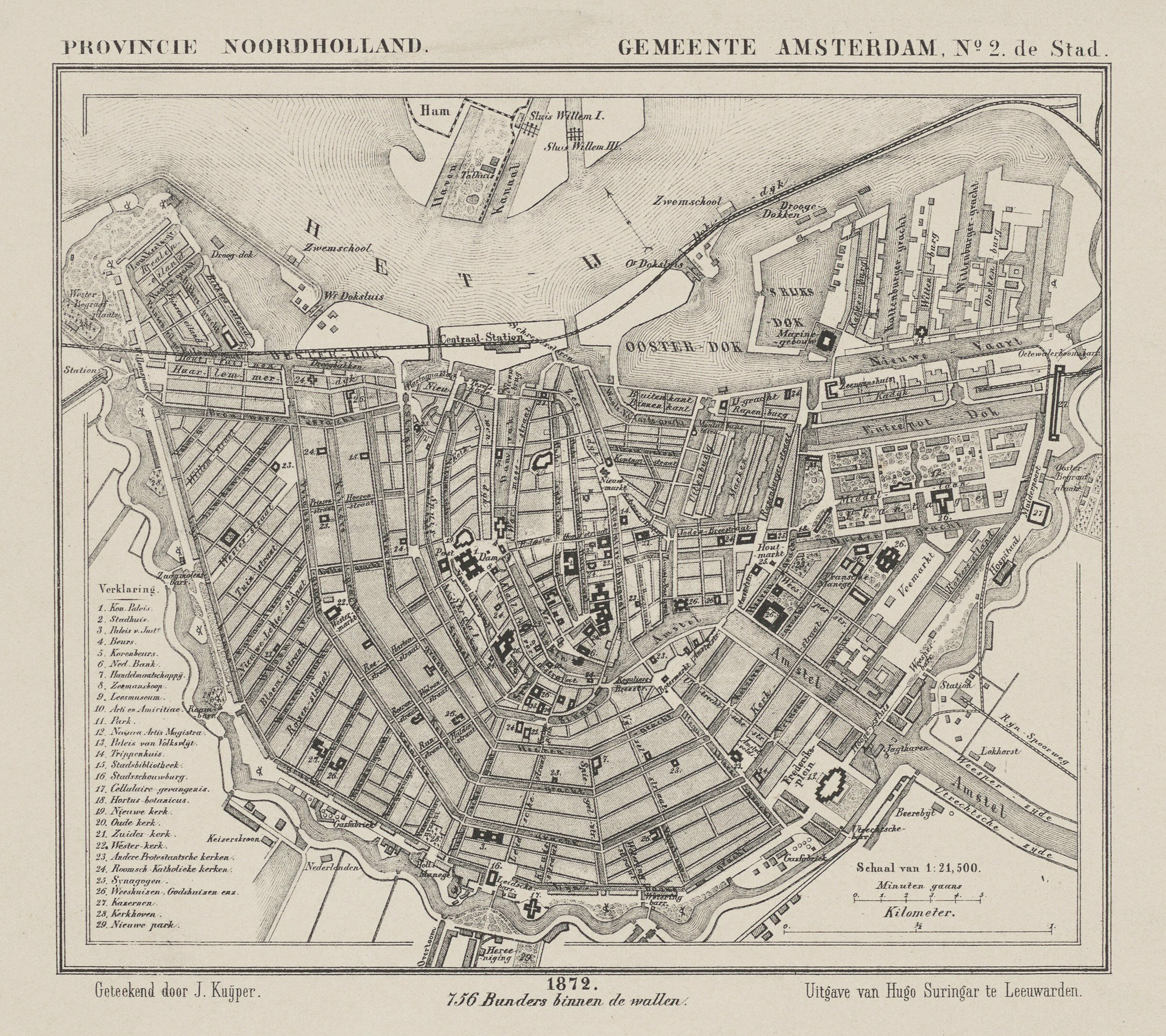
1872 map with dry docks in Westerdok and Oosterdok

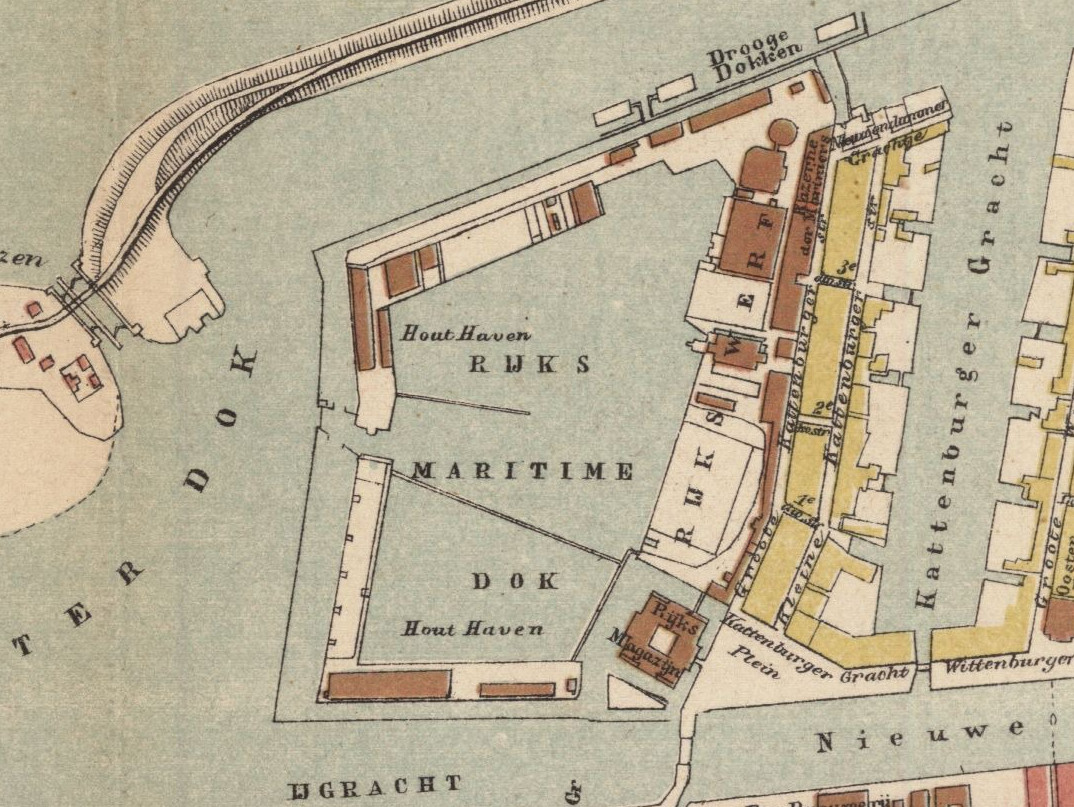
Oosterdok 1875 fragment showing three dry docks

The dock, or rather the raft, was brought below the waterline by adding ballast to the sides. I.e. in the water compartments. After a ship had been brought into the dock, the door was closed. Next, the communication between the outside water and the compartments was closed off, and the communication between the compartments and the pumps opened. The pumps then emptied the compartments, causing the dock to rise, which allowed most water inside the dock to flow out via the door. This continued till the lower, watertight part, of the door started to get above water. Next the communication between the compartments and the inside of the dock was opened, so the pumps could pump out the remaining water.

The height of the water above the raft, that the door had to keep out was not that much. For the average big Dutch ship of 600-ton displacement, it was only 21 cm above the floor of the dock. For smaller ships, the door could even be reopened after they had been lifted. For contemporary frigates Oordt, thought that the water would stay 80–90 cm above the raft of a suitable wooden dry dock.

=== Dimensions ===
According to Le Comte, the length of the first Amsterdam dock was 170 Amsterdam feet, or 48.132 m. Beam was 66 Amsterdam feet 18.687 m on the outside. Depth of hold was 22 Amsterdam feet 6.228 m. The raft was 1.132 m high, making that the whole dock had a draft of 56.6 cm when empty. According to Van Oordt the dry dock was 48.10 m long, had a beam of 18.70 m and a depth of hold of 6.50 m. Still according to him it had a draft of 1.00 m and carried 160 lasts ballast. A Dutch last was 1,976.4 kg. Van Oordt wrote somewhat later than Le Comte, but Van Oordt's figures for draft might take better account of ballast.

Diets would build more drydocks in Amsterdam. The first three Amsterdam drydocks were just below 50 m long. At the time Willem I Lock connected Amsterdam to the Noordhollandsch Kanaal and was the only deep connection from Amsterdam to the sea. At the time the lock had a length of 56.86 m. Sailing ships had bowsprits that were allowed to stick out significantly over the front of the Amsterdam dry dock (see the painting), but this could not be done at Willem I Lock. This explains the difference in length between the Amsterdam drydocks and the lock.

=== Machinery ===
There were 6 pumps of 56 cm diameter with a stroke of 45.7 cm, making 50 strokes a minute. The steam engine was made by Van Vlissingen en Dudok van Heel and produced 8 hp.

=== Ordering and construction ===
Amsterdam dry dock 1 was ordered at shipyard J.R. Boelen en Zonen. By May 1842 it was under construction. On 6 August the dry dock stoom-drijfdok was launched from the Oude Compagnie-werf, probably meaning the old VOC shipyard at Oostenburg Island. The dry dock would be commissioned on 23 November 1842. The location was the so-called 'Pijp' in the Oosterdok of Amsterdam. This is the Dijksgracht

== Service ==
=== First service ===
The first Amsterdam floating dry dock was put into use on 23 November 1842. The first ship serviced was the frigate Koning Willem II, belonging to J.P. Janette Walen. According to Le Comte it was of 39.6 m length, 11 m beam and 3.6 m draught and about 800 tons. Others had 39.63 m by 10.76 m by 3.40 m and 1,000 tons. Again others had 140 Amsterdam feet by 38 and 12 Amsterdam feet, and 1,000 tons. The tons mentioned here were indeed Dutch weight tons, i.e. metric tonnes, not tons that relate to the cargo capacity of the ship.

The first Amsterdam dock was immediately successful. From 23 November 1842 till October 1843, it serviced 64 ships. On average these measured 600 tons, but there were some of over 1,000 tons. Ship owners were surprised and pleased by its flexibility, which meant that out of shape keels could be accommodated without damaging the ship. The ease by which ships could be expected within a day, and the low cost, gave rise to coppered Amsterdam ships getting inspected after every voyage.

=== Influence on other dry docks ===
Some people from Le Havre visited Amsterdam in 1843 to see the dock in action. They then ordered Diets to supply the wood for a floating dry dock of 212 Amsterdam feet (28.3133 cm) length (60 m). Soon there was a rumor that the shipping magnates that operated the Amsterdam drydock would operate an equivalent drydock in Surabaya. The patent of 8 May 1843, prolonged for ten years on 21 April 1844, probably relates to this plan.

=== The painting of the dry dock ===
There exists a painting of the dry dock as it was moored near the Rijkswerf Amsterdam. It was made by Hendrik Vettewinkel (1809-1878), and is thought to show the visit of King William II of the Netherlands to the dry dock. Newspapers of the time indeed have a visit of the king to Amsterdam in 1843, and him visiting the Rijkswerf and the dry dock on 29 April. The ship Amstel was on the dock. There was music, everything was decorated with flags, and the king was rowed to the dry dock in the Koningssloep (royal boat). The latter two aspects are indeed present on the painting.

=== Other service ===
In January 1843 Captain J.G. Jansen of the coppered Barque Ellida (394 ton), trading to the north, made a remarkable report. In October 1842 he sailed from New York to Amsterdam, when he got hit by a storm. It smashed all deck houses, and in the end some seams opened by more than 0.5 cm, and the ship became leaky. From 5 to 15 January 1843 Ellida visited the dry dock. Here the storms of 13–14 January did not hurt it at all. What was remarkable, was that the captain stated that the seams closed up once the barque stood dry on the dock. It was then caulked and after some reinforcements had been added, it stayed in form after it had been refloated.

== The other three dry docks of Reederij der Drijvende Droogdokken ==
=== Amsterdam Wooden Drydock II, the Westerdok Drydock ===
Amsterdam Wooden Drydock II was the second dry dock built for Reederij der Drijvende Droogdokken, and was stationed in the Westerdok. It was commissioned on 30 September 1844.

=== The third dry dock, second wooden drydock on the Dijksgracht ===
In May 1848 a third dry dock was commissioned by the Reederij der Drijvende Droogdokken. It was built by Blok and Matthijsen at shipyard Hollandia. It was the second dry dock that Reederij der Drijvende Droogdokken stationed at Dijksgracht in the Oosterdok.

=== The fourth dry dock, third wooden drydock on the Dijksgracht ===
The fourth dry dock of Reederij der Drijvende Droogdokken was completed in June 1857. It was built by Hollandia Shipyard of Blok and Matthijsen, and was said to be able to handle the biggest ships.
