= Amsterdam Wooden Drydock II =

Second floating dry dock of Amsterdam

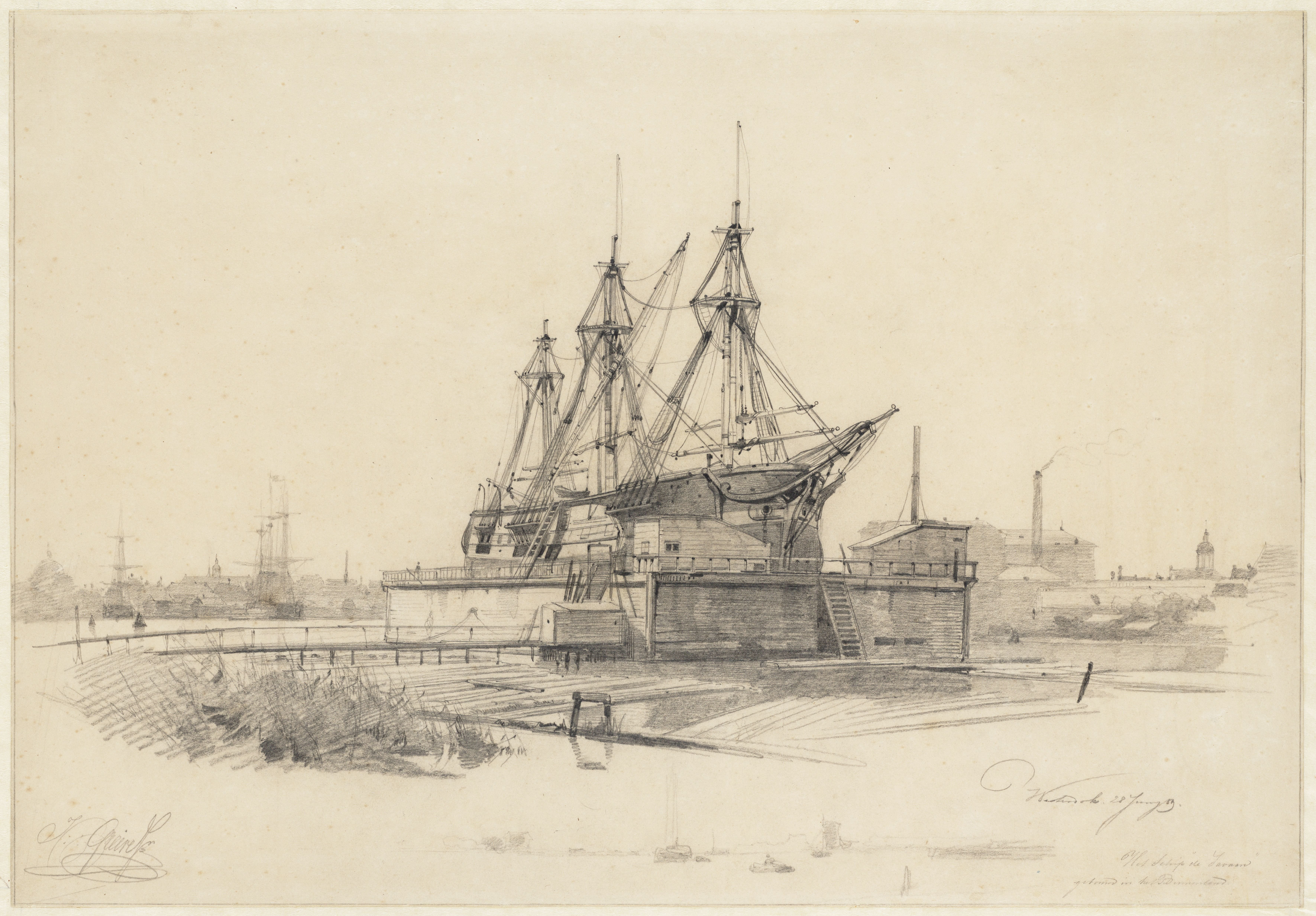
- Amsterdam Wooden Drydock II with ship De Javaan, on 28 June 1859 by Johan Conrad Greive

History

Netherlands
- Name: Amsterdam Wooden Drydock II
- Ordered: 1844
- Commissioned: 30 September 1844
- Out of service: Sold, 14 July 1890
- Home port: Amsterdam; 52.388323°N 4.891018°E

General characteristics (as completed)
- Length: 49.50 m (162.4 ft)
- Beam: 18.70 m (61.4 ft)
- Draft: 1.20 m (3.9 ft) (empty)
- Depth of hold: 6.50 m (21.3 ft)

Amsterdam Wooden Drydock II was the second floating dry dock of Amsterdam, and was moored in the Westerdok.

== Context ==
=== A floating Dry dock in the Amsterdam Wet Docks ===
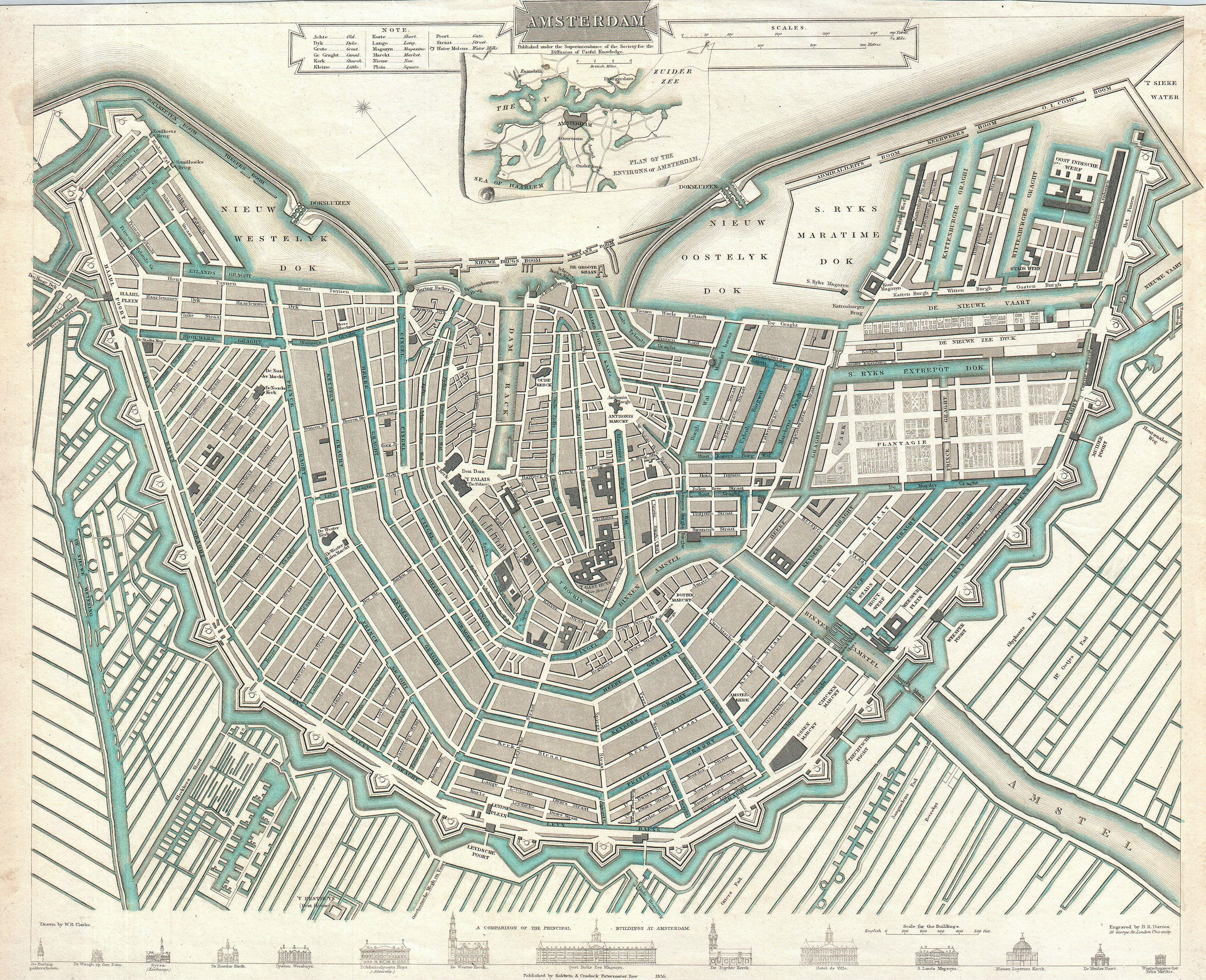
Amsterdam in 1835, with Westerdok and Oosterdok

In November 1842 Amsterdam Wooden Drydock I, the first dry dock of Amsterdam had opened. It was a wooden floating dry dock, and was an immediate success, servicing 64 ships in just under a year. At the time Amsterdam had two large wet docks: Westerdok and Oosterdok. Drydock I was situated in the more important Oosterdok.

=== Rederij der Drijvende Droogdokken ===
The Rederij der Drijvende Droogdokken held a license to the patent to operate dry docks in Amsterdam for 5 years, i.e. till December 1846. In order to protect its investments, it would be logical to want to try to prolong this right, and to keep out the competition. Both required the Rederij der Drijvende Droogdokken to realize a second dry dock before the extinction of the patent. Primarily because an attempt to prolong the patent was not likely to be successful if authorities thought that the market was not well serviced. Second, because potential competitors would be attracted by a market that was not well served. Later on, numbers showed that the demand for dry dock capacity was even bigger than that serviced by the first two dry docks.

Another reason to build a second dry dock was that the company also had to service demand in the Westerdok. Of course ships in the Westerdok could be towed to the Oosterdok to use the dry dock(s) there, but such a move cost so much money, that any competitor setting up shop in the Westerdok would have a good proposition.

== Design, Construction and Characteristics ==
=== Ordering and Construction ===
By August 1844 it became known that shipping line Rederij der Drijvende Droogdokken had decided to build a second dry dock, and to moor it in the Westerdok. Because the dry dock was wider than the Westerdok lock, it would have been built by a shipyard in the Westerdok.

=== Characteristics ===
Amsterdam Wooden Drydock I had been based on an American dry dock that started to operate in New York in 1839-1840. The New York dry dock had been constructed by John S. Gilbert (1801-1891), inventor of the balance dry dock. In turn, Amsterdam Wooden Drydock II was an almost exact copy of Amsterdam Wooden Drydock I. Even the dimensions were about the same.

Drydock II was 49.50 m long, 18.70 m wide, and had a depth of hold of 6.50 m. Draft was 1.20 m with 240 last ballast. So, only the length and the draft differed from Drydock I, but the 20 cm more draft, might be explained by the 240 last ballast instead of 160 last (A Dutch last measured about 2,000 kg).

When it was taken into use there was a particular note that Amsterdam Wooden Drydock II was a good 14 m longer than the dry dock in the Oosterdok. This remark about the extra length might have been caused by confusing this dry dock with the Le Havre dock. Van Oordt clearly has the first three dry docks of about even length, and the Le Havre Dock about 15 m longer. An even more likely explanation is that someone made a typo: 14 m longer, instead of the 1.4 m that Van Oordt has.

It furthermore would have made little sense to make the dry dock in the Westerdok 14 m longer. Willem I Lock had a lock chamber of 65.41 m with a smaller usable length, but the Westerdok Lock had a lock chamber of only 44 m long.

== Service ==
=== Opening of the dry dock ===
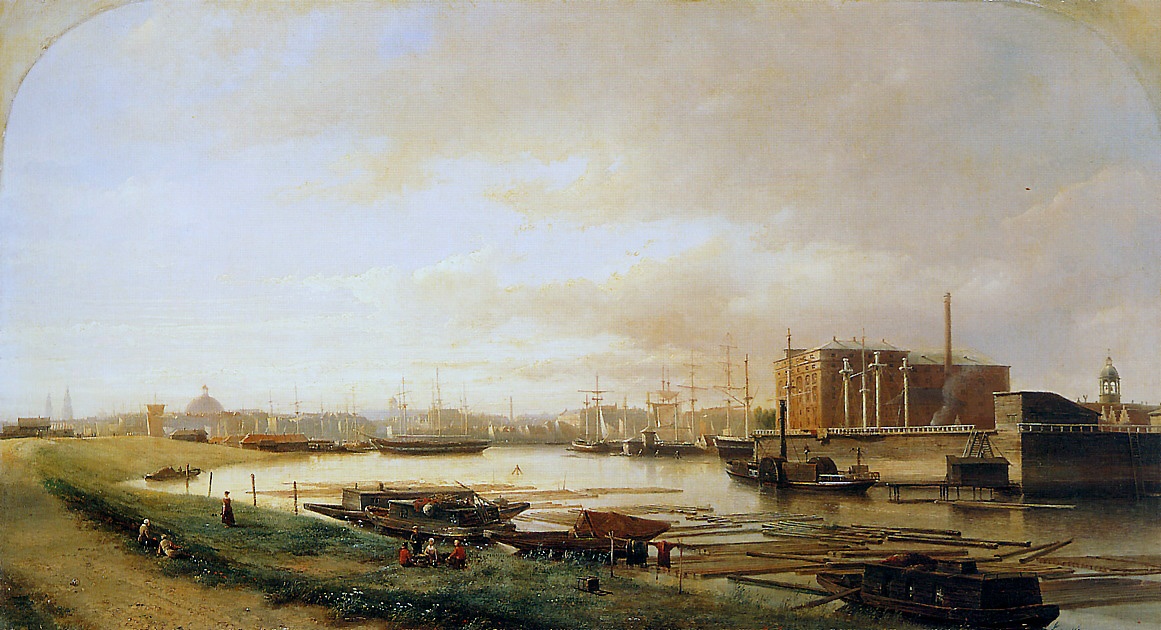
Amsterdam Wooden Drydock II in the Westerdok

On 30 September 1844 Amsterdam Wooden Drydock II was opened by receiving the large three mast ship Africa. Africa was owned by Boelen en Co. and regularly sailed to West Africa (Guinee). She left the dock again on 1 October.

Afrika was built by shipyard De Haan on Bikkerstraat by shipbuilders J.R. Boelen en Zonen. She was launched on 20 April 1841, and measured 200 lasts.

A visit to the Westerdok by the Koninklijk Instituut van Ingenieurs in 1858 showed just how much the dry dock was part of modern technology in 1858. On 14 September the members of the institute visited: The Amsterdam Gas Factory; The Rope Walk of Messrs. Holst and Kooi; Machine factory De Atlas; Amsterdam Wooden Drydock II; and the Amsterdamsche Stoom Suikerraffinaderij.

=== Drawing of Javaan in the dry dock ===
From 1859 there is a drawing of the dry dock by Johan Conrad Greive (1837-1891). It shows De Javaan on the dry dock. De Javaan is mentioned in an 1860 overview as a frigate under Captain H. Munnix. Flag No. 275, shipping line J. Kooij and J. Kooij Jr. capacity 736 ton, and dating from 1826. Javaan arrived from Batavia in Texel on 14 May 1859. On her next return voyage she ran aground near Egmond aan Zee in January 1861, but got free on her own. In March 1861 the frigate Javaan of 736 ton or 389 last was offered for sale in the Oosterdok. "De Javaan" was a special ship, because it had been built in the Dutch East Indies. As such a note by J. Kooij Jr. about her good qualities made it into a political debate about building navy ships in the Dutch East Indies, instead of sending them from the Netherlands.

=== Other depictions of the dry dock ===
Amsterdam Wooden Drydock II is depicted almost in its entirety on a c. 1860 painting of the Westerdok by Kaspar Karsen. This also depicts the Amsterdamsche Stoom Suikerraffinaderij. Another painting of the dry dock is by Jacobus Plaat, which is dated 1859. The Meursing collection had an 1880 photograph of the dry dock.

== The End ==
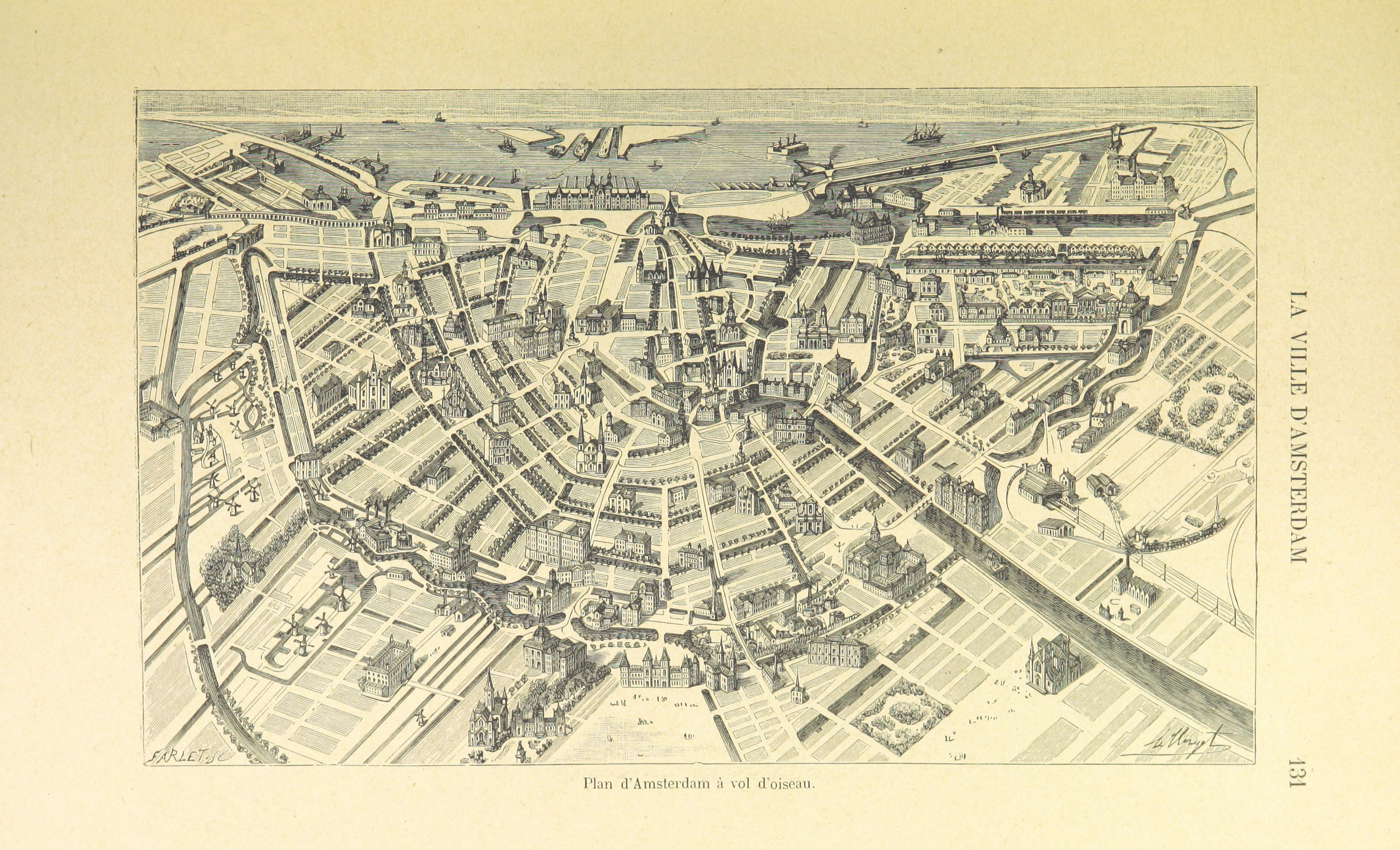
The dry dock depicted on 1893 map

On 16 June 1890 Westerdok Wooden Drydock was auctioned for breakup, except for the boiler. The condition of removal or breakup might have been caused by overcapacity in the dry docks for smaller ships. Together with two carpenter rafts, a rowboat, and four spars, it fetched 2,549 guilders. The deal obviously failed, because a second auction was to take place on 7 July. This was then postponed to 14 July.

The break up rendered materials that conformed to the description given by Van Oordt. On 7 August 1890 a large amount of oak, pine and fir from the dry dock in the Westerdok was offered. On 6 September 1890 an amount of about 200 lasts of stone ballast was offered from the demolition of the dry dock. In November 1890 pines of 18 m length and beams of 20 * 30 cm were offered.
