= Oranje Locks =

Water management facilities near Amsterdam, Netherlands

Oranje Locks and Prins Willem Alexander Lock
- Oranjesluizen en Prins Willem Alexander Sluis
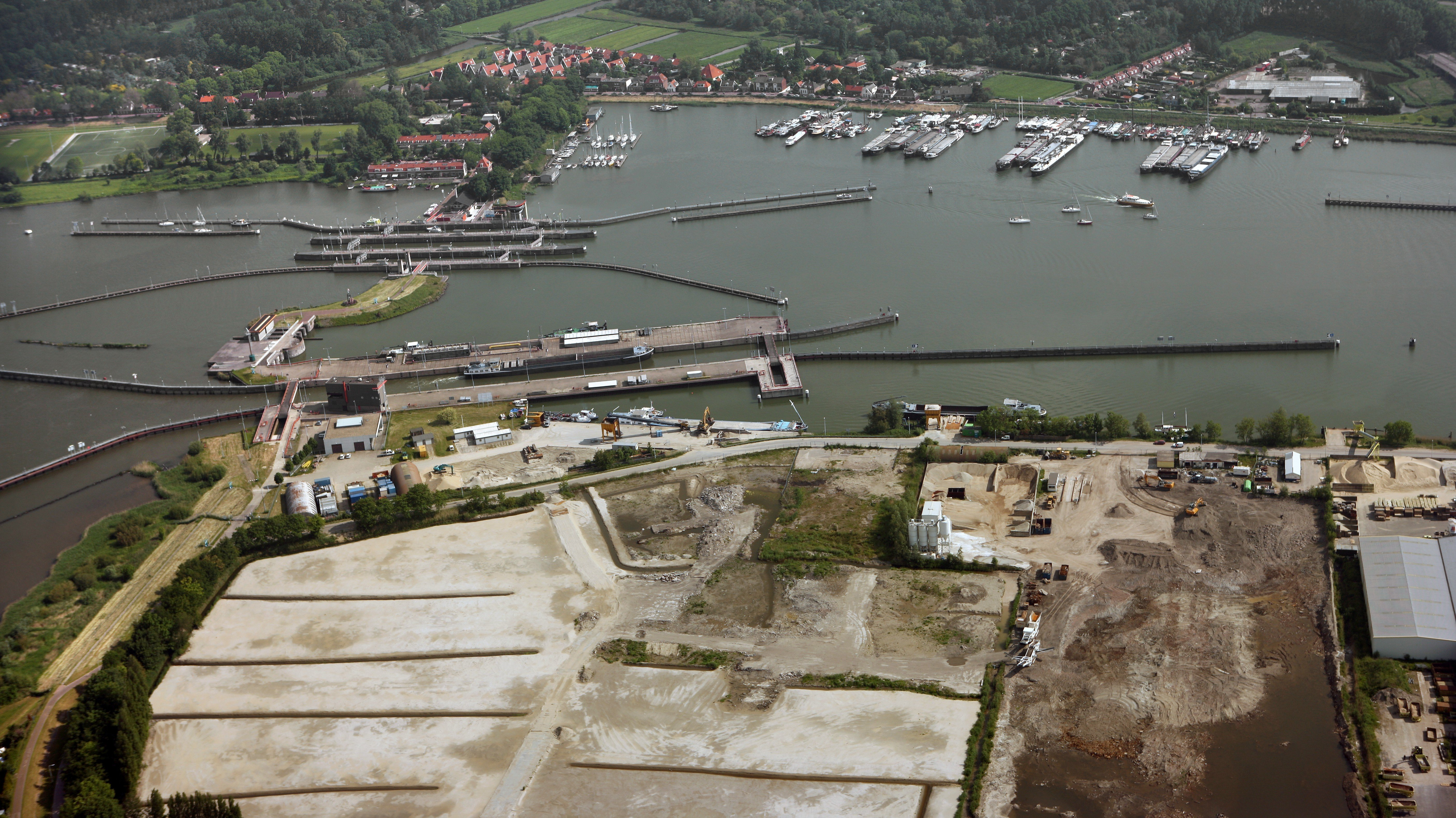
- Oranje Locks from the south in 2009 by Doriann Kransberg
- Interactive map of Oranje Locks and Prins Willem Alexander Lock
- 52.381632°N 4.960778°E
- Waterway: IJ
- Country: Netherlands
- County: North Holland
- Maintained by: Rijkswaterstaat
- First built: 18 March 1872 / 1995
- Length: 70 m; 90 m; 70 m; 200 m
- Width: 13.50 m; 17.50 m; 13.50 m; 24.10 m

The Oranje Locks are a group of locks and other water management facilities just east of Amsterdam.

== Characteristics ==
The Oranje Locks are located in the IJ Dijk, a dam which cuts through the IJ just east of Amsterdam. This dam runs from the village of Schellingwoude in the north to the eastern side of the Amsterdam–Rhine Canal in the south. The dam closes off the Inner IJ, just north of Amsterdam, from the Outer IJ, and hence from the IJsselmeer / Markermeer.

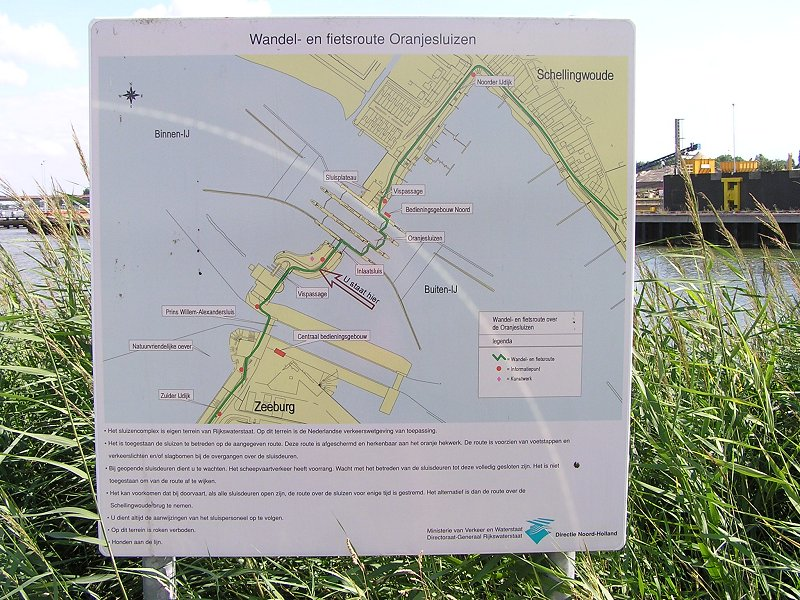
Floor plan Oranjesluizen.

The Oranje Locks consists of the original locks called Oranje Locks and the recent Prins Willem-Alexander Lock. They regulate the water level in the North Sea Canal, and prevent brackish water from reaching the IJmeer. As it is part of the waterways of national interest, the locks are managed by Rijkswaterstaat.

The original Oranje Locks consist of three locks that are now used for recreational vessels and small commercial ships. These are traditional locks with gates that are kept closed by the water pressure. The largest has a lock chamber of 90 m by 17.50 m. The two on its sides have lock chambers of 67 m by 14 m. The two locks on the sides form a pure twin lock, i.e. two locks of the same size in the same location with the purpose of increasing the speed with which ships are serviced.

The biggest lock at the location is the Prins Willem-Alexander Lock opened in 1995. This is a lock of an innovative type, with sliding gates which use a 'hydro foot'. The hydro foot is an alternative to the wheels which normally support a sliding gate. The idea is that a 0.1 mm layer of water in the two hydro feet supports the 50 ton lock door. The lock chamber of Prins Willem-Alexander Lock is 200 m by 24 m.

Every year about 120,000 vessels use the locks. Pedestrians and cyclists can cross the IJ over the dam and locks. The dam also has two fish ladders. Just north of the locks are the first stone houses of Schellingwoude. The 23 houses were built for the engineer, the lock master, the maintenance official, and a number of workers. There is also a former post and telegraph office for skippers dating from 1909.

== Context and plans for closing the IJ ==
=== The connection of Amsterdam to the sea silts up (1600-1830) ===
In the seventeenth and eighteenth century the approaches to the harbor of Amsterdam became ever shallower. This was blamed on sediment getting pushed into the Zuiderzee from the north. Most of it collected near Pampus, a shoal which became ever higher. In order to circumvent the shallows near Pampus, the Noordhollandsch Kanaal was constructed from 1820 to 1825. This ship canal connected Amsterdam to the harbor of Nieuwediep at Den Helder. The canal created an inland waterway by which ocean-going ships could reach the IJ. For quite some time, this provided Amsterdam with a suitable connection to the sea.

The Noordhollandsch Kanaal did nothing to deepen the harbor of Amsterdam. Plans to solve this by dredging were not successful. This is how the idea to construct a dam and locks in the IJ, just east of Amsterdam came up. From 1826 to 1828 the government worked on the realization of the Goudriaan Canal. This was a canal which would circumvent the Pampus shallows by digging a canal from the IJ through Waterland and Marken Island. In order to prevent the area south of the canal from silting up, a dam would be constructed through the IJ just east of the entrance of the canal. The execution of this plan was opposed by Amsterdam, because of this closure of the IJ. When Amsterdam accepted to construct the Westerdok and Oosterdok wet docks in order to get a deep water port, the Goudriaan plan was cancelled. This way Amsterdam also again got a suitable harbor for some time.

=== Plans for the North Sea Canal ===
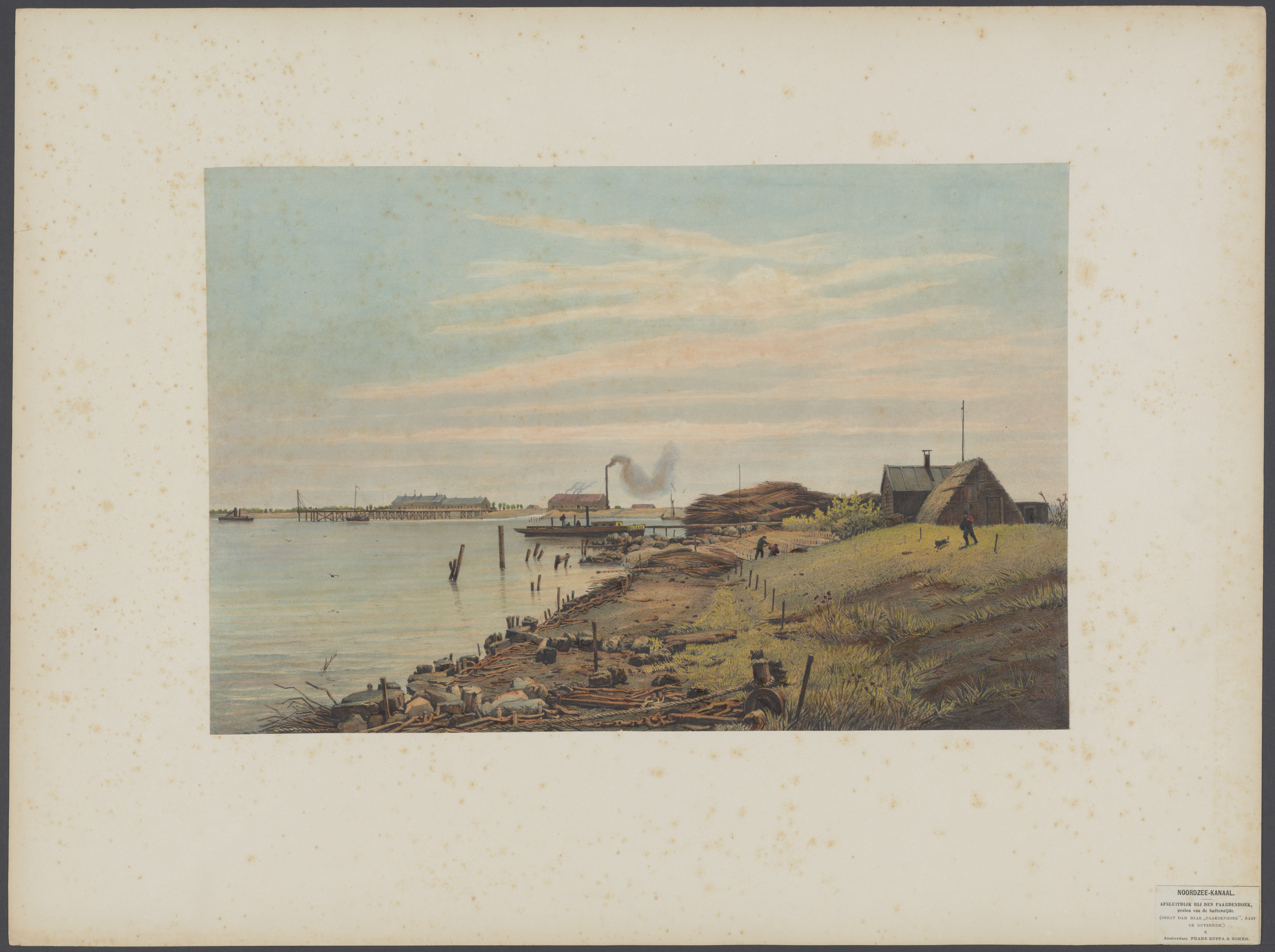
The dam near Paardenhoek, 19th century

After the opening of the Noordhollandsch Kanaal, the size of ocean-going ships continued to increase. Slowly the Noordhollandsch Kanaal became unsuitable for Amsterdam. In 1852 the municipality of Amsterdam ordered an investigation into the possibilities for constructing a canal from Amsterdam to the west, the later North Sea Canal. At first nothing came of the plans to construct the canal. This changed when the Amsterdam Municipality offered 3,000,000 guilders in support of the canal in March 1860. In October 1860 a law for the North Sea Canal was proposed. It contained a design for a canal which would end near Willem I Lock, at the start of the Noordhollandsch Kanaal.

The first serious plan for the North Sea Canal was rather straightforward. It was projected north of the IJ and had two locks, one at the sea side, and one at the IJ near Amsterdam. This way, the level of the canal could be maintained. The disadvantage of this solution was that ocean-going ships would have to pass two locks to get before Amsterdam. The general mood in Amsterdam was for supporting this plan, for fear of not getting a canal at all. However, when the details were discussed, it was noted that the reasons to resist the dam and locks in the eastern IJ in 1828, were no longer valid.

=== Plans to dam of the IJ ===
In August 1861, the municipality of Amsterdam announced to the government that it wished to close of the IJ east of Amsterdam. This idea would become the key of the North Sea canal as it was constructed. With other concessions, this led to the law of July 1862, which proposed to sponsor the construction of the North Sea Canal by a private company. In December 1862 and January 1863 both chambers of the parliament finally gave their consent to this plan.

In the first versions of the final plan, the IJ was closed of from the Zuiderzee by a dam which stretched from the polder IJdoorn in the north over the Pampus shallows to a battery position in the Diemer Buitenpolder in the south. (Dutch sources rather consistently referred to a dijk, and not to a dam. It was generally called afsluitdijk till the 1932 Afsluitdijk was built.) This planned location seems in line with a location from the Goudriaan Canal plan. This dam would be the first work to be completed. Amsterdam urged its completion before any other works in the IJ, in order to prevent further silting up of its harbor during the construction of the canal. Somewhat later a commission ruled that a 1 km wide stretch of this dam would have to be left open until its lock, sluices and their steam engine had been commissioned.

The Pampus Dam of the plan presented in July 1862, contained one lock. This lock would be 18 m wide with a depth of 4.50 m below Amsterdam Ordnance Datum (AOD). It would have three pairs of gates facing the Zuiderzee, and two pairs facing the IJ. Before the lock, 300 ships would have to be able to more at quays in the Zuiderzee. There would also be sluices in this dam, which would keep the canal at the desired level with assistance of a steam engine. (In Dutch, sluis can mean a lock or a sluice, and so the Dutch could refer to both by using the plural sluizen, but in this case it meant one lock, plus one or more sluices.) The length of the Pampus dam would be 4.5 km.

=== Final location of the Oranje Locks ===
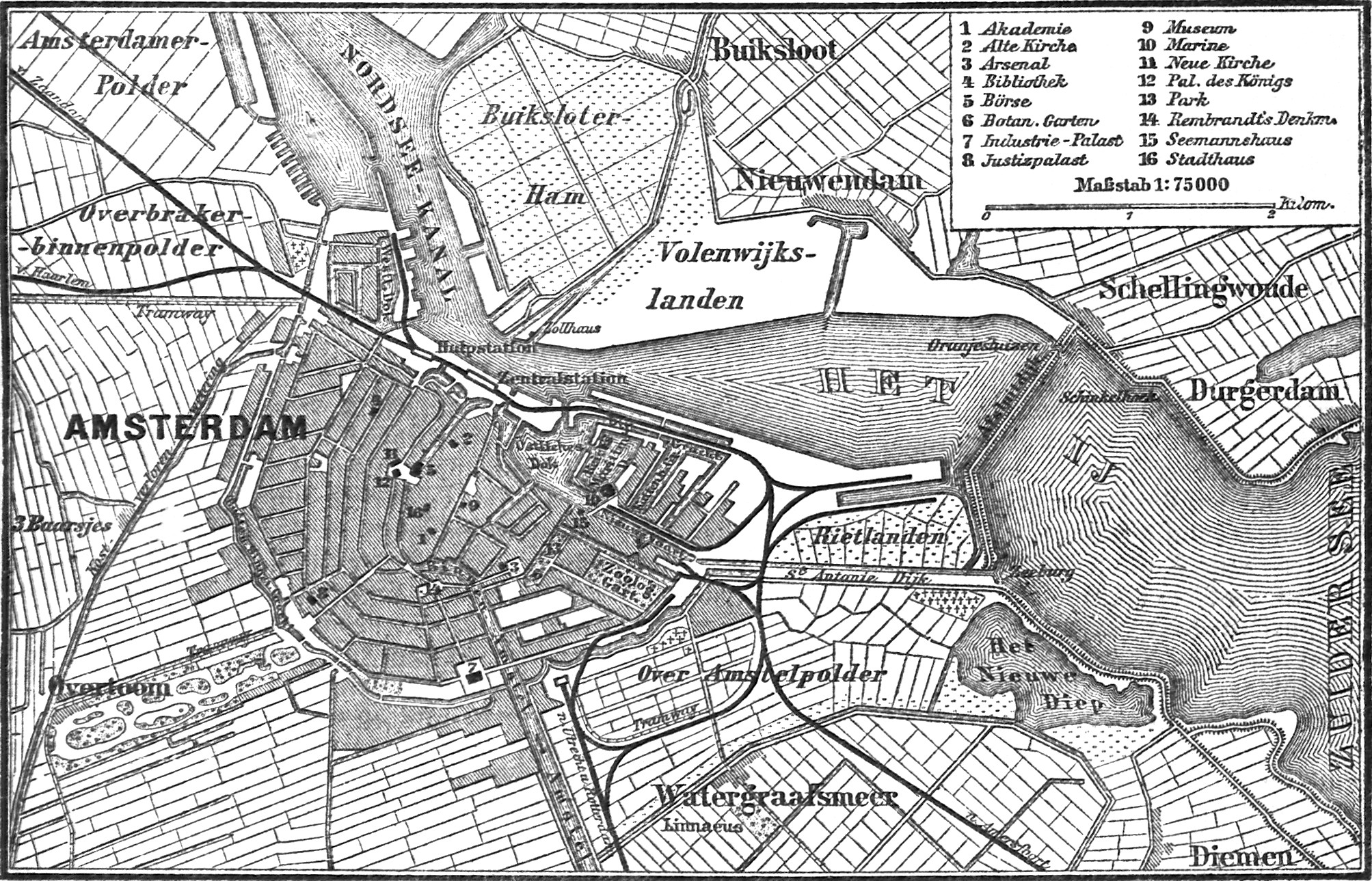
c. 1890 map with Afsluitdijk

In March 1864 a request from the skippers of vessels on the Zuiderzee was sent to the government. They opposed the location of the dike from near the lighthouse on the IJ at Vuurtoreneiland towards Diemer Buitenpolder. Instead, they wished that the dike would be constructed as close as possible to Amsterdam. They favored a location between Paardehoek (north east angle of the dam around the Oosterdok near Zeeburg) and the city. By October 1865 the government allowed the constructor of the North Sea Canal to choose between closing the IJ at Pampus or at Paardehoek. By November 1865 the changed plan referred to the lock and sluices at Paardenhoek.

The changed plan for closing off the IJ still contained only one lock, and multiple sluices. The projected long and wide lock did not cater to the interests of the skippers on the Zuiderzee. Their small but very numerous vessels could be serviced by one large lock, but they foresaw long waiting hours. Instead they thought that three locks were required, even if they were smaller. At about this time the locks got named Zuiderzee Sluizen (Zuiderzee Locks). The construction of the North Sea Canal was led by Justus Dirks. The part of the Oranje Locks was entrusted to G.J. van Gendt Jr.

== Construction of the Oranje Locks ==
=== Construction of the dam ===
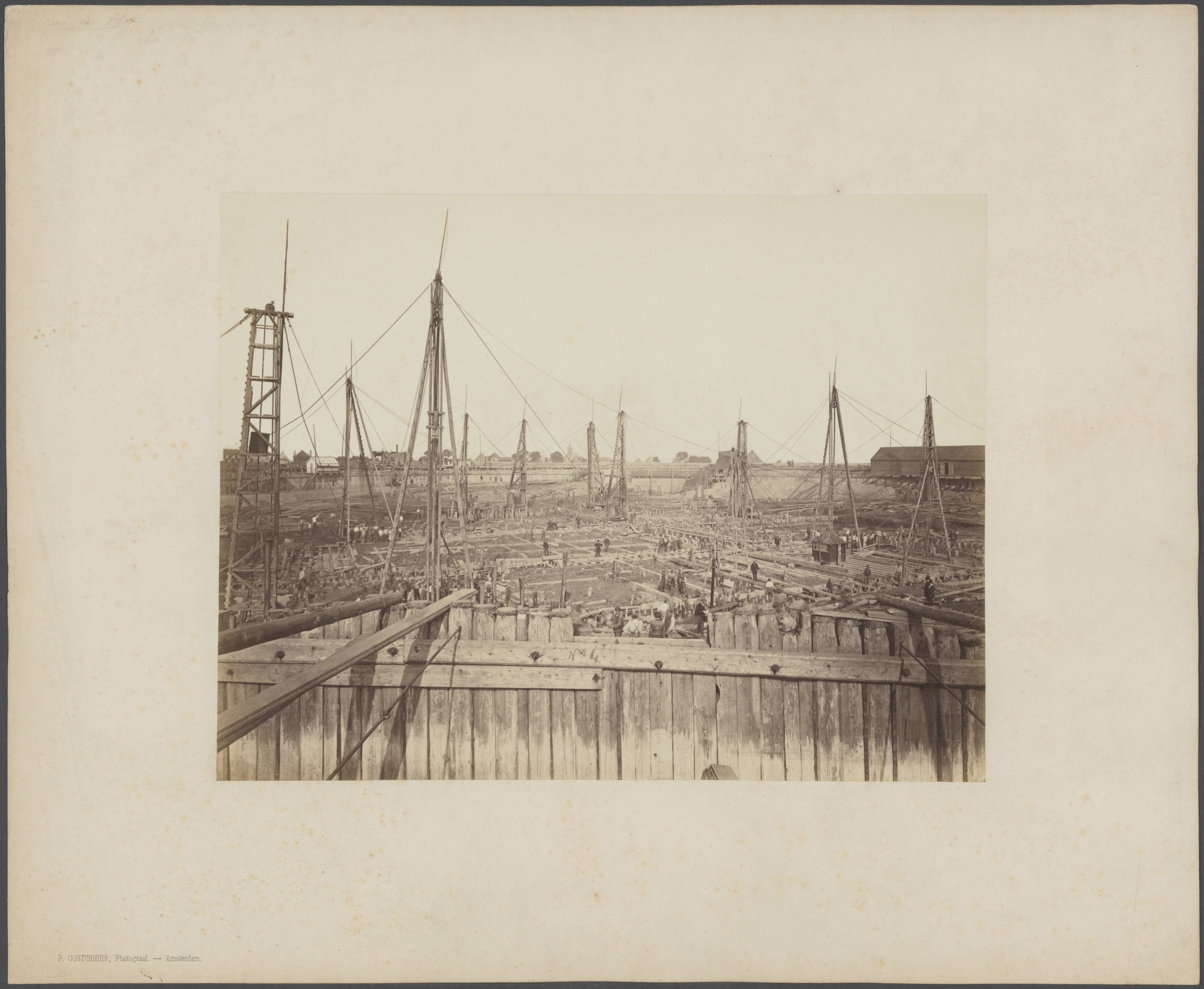
pile driving in the pit

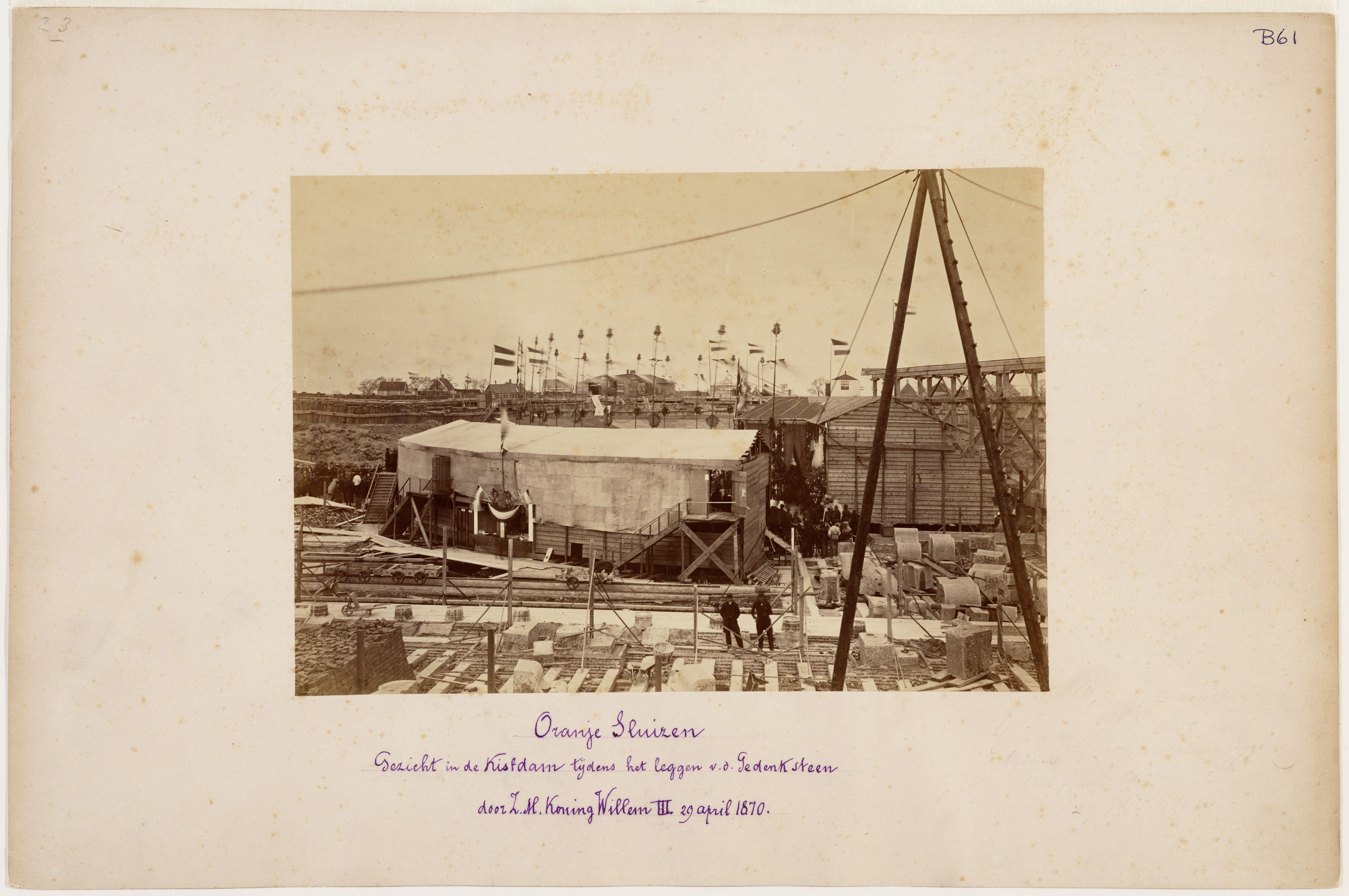
Cornerstone festivities

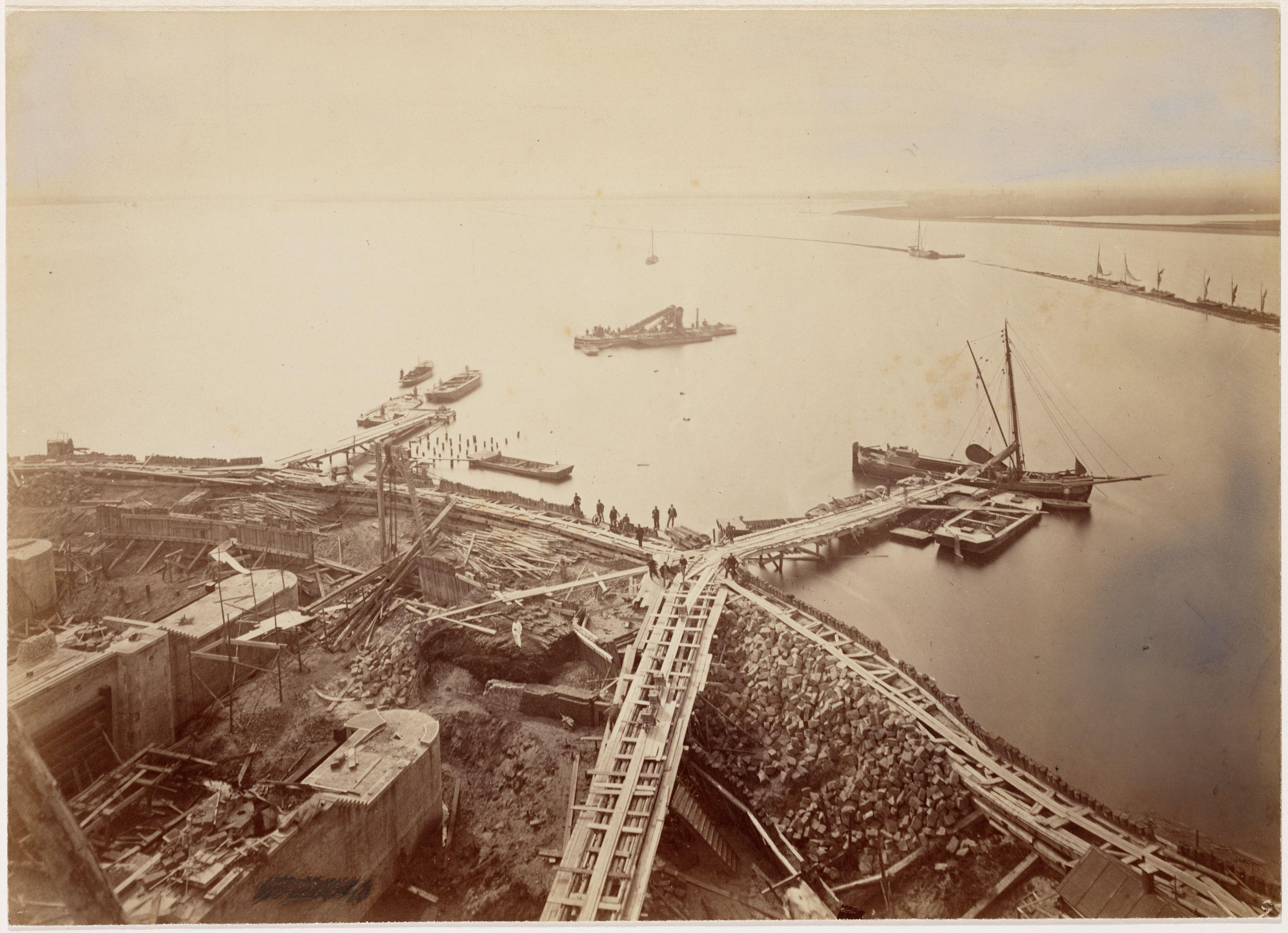
Construction in July 1871

The dam through the IJ was 45 m wide at the base, and 4 m at the top. The top was 3.5 m above AOD. The IJ side of the dam was steeper than the Zuiderzee side. The slopes, berm and top of the dam were faced with a layer of at least 1 m of puddle clay. From the top to 0.5 m below AOD temporary fascines loaded with stones protected the dam against waves on both sides. After closure of the dam, this was replaced by stone pitching till the top on the Zuiderzee side, and till the berm on the IJ-side. The pitching was at least 0.30 m thick, with a layer of 0.20 m of broken bricks below. The dam was constructed by first putting a 2 ft 6 in (0.8 m) thick mattress of interwoven fascines (rijshout) over the whole breadth of the dam. The first of these zinkstukken was called grondstuk, because it reposed on the bottom or ground. In two places these grondstukken would later break, causing considerable sinkage.

By October 1866 the dam from the Waterland dike till the future location of the locks in the 'pit of Schellingwoude' and a part of south of it was under construction. About a 100 meters of it had already reached a height of 1 m above AOD. During 1867 work on the dike steadily progressed.

=== Construction of the Cofferdam of Schellingwoude ===
The Cofferdam of Schellingwoude was constructed in the area where the locks, the pumping station and a sluice were planned. Here, the water was 3 m deep. The cofferdam later proved to be one of the most difficult aspects of the plan. The cofferdam Kistdam was originally a circle of 160 m diameter on the inside, surrounded by two concentric rows of closely aligned sheet piles with a space in between the circles of 6 ft 6 in (2.0 m). The space in between the piles was filled up with puddle clay. On the inside a mound of sand was to act as a counter weight to the water pressure. The pit would be made empty so the foundations could be constructed on dry ground. When empty, the pit would face the massive pressure from the water on the outside.

On 9 July 1866 the first pile was driven. It became part of a dolphin, to which the piles of the exterior ring were set. A correct measurement of the distance of 80+ m was crucial to attain the perfect circle which would give maximum strength to the coffer dam, but this led to much trouble. A hempen rope stretched unevenly, floating rods could not be kept in place, and finally an iron wire rope kept strained by weight was used.

By October 1866 a thousand piles had been driven into the ground to form the cofferdam. The idea was to finish it before winter set in. Works on the foundations for the pumping station, sluice and locks could then start in spring. However, the final design for the lock and sluices had not yet been sent in for government approval. By February 1867 100-120 piles still had to be driven in.

=== Cofferdam troubles and the foundations of the locks ===
On 11 May 1868 the pit for the foundations was made dry. That month 3,000 m^{3} of ground was removed from the pit. In June another 3,500 m^{3} of ground was removed, and part of the digging reached a level of 6 m below AOD. In July another 10,500 m^{3} was removed. On 19 July the first pile for the locks was driven into the ground.

On 29 August some water came up inside the pit near the pumps. The contractor then decided to open the sluices of the pit so it would be filled with water and no further damage would occur. Next, a new screen of closely fitting piles was driven 5 m inside the ring to secure the bad place. 3,600 m^{3} of sand was then used to fill up this place. The pumps were relocated to a position outside the cofferdam. After these repairs the pit was made dry again, and on 25 September pile driving was resumed. A total of 587 piles would be driven till a real disaster occurred.

A big disaster took place at the cofferdam on 25 October 1868. By 16:30 a preceding storm had made that the water level had risen to 1 m above AOD. The pit then began to leak severely, and the pit sluices were opened. Soon after, a huge mass of earth then broke of near the northern pit sluice, about 10 m from the inner ring of piles. At the place of the earth movement the ground then fell in, leaving the piles bare for a depth of 30 feet. The cofferdam next began to bend inward, and in two minutes a breach opened. Still one minute later, the whole pit had been filled up. Four boats were drawn in, one of these sank almost immediately. The total breach was about 20 m wide, and the initial flood had hit the opposite side with such force that it was permanently bent outwards.

After the October 1868 incident a lengthy process of reinforcing the dam around the pit started. This was primarily done by depositing more sand on the inside and outside of the cofferdam. A new row of close piles was driven on the inside, at a distance of 9 m from the inner of the concentric rings of piles. This new ring would keep the sand on the inside in place. Where there was enough room, sandbag buttresses with layers of fascines were added for further strength. Outside of the outer ring three groynes of pile work were constructed at the most exposed place in order to keep the waves from flushing the sand away. These works lasted till June 1869 and involved driving about 2,000 piles and use of 37,336 m^{3} of sand.

In May 1869 pile driving was resumed. In general two kinds of piles were driven. There were over 10,000 bearing piles. These would keep the masonry and brickwork from sinking into the ground. The foundations of the sills and the lock walls were surrounded by close sheet piling. This would prevent the sea from washing away the ground below these walls, clearing the bearing piles. In May 185 piles were driven, bringing the total to 772. In June and July pile driving continued at a steady pace, and in July other parts of the foundation were started. In October the number of foundation piles driven in reached 6,829. In November only 51 piles were driven, but more was done on the other parts of the foundation. In December 1869 995 piles were driven in. On 15 March 1870 the final pile was driven.

=== Construction of the locks ===
On 28 April King William III set the marble cornerstone stone of the locks in the Pit of Schellingwoude. He was assisted by the English engineer John Hawkshaw, the first engineer Dirks and adjunct-engineer Van Doorn. After a gun salute and playing the national anthem, the king, the crown prince, the government ministers, and a large group of dignitaries had lunch in a temporary building at the bottom of the pit. This was also the occasion that the locks were named Oranjesluizen (Orange Locks).

Already in November 1870 the last stone rabbet for the lock gates was put in place. By December 1870 all lock walls had reached their designated height. The lock gates were under construction, and the 18 gates for the pumping station sluices were ready. In June 1871 9 of the 10 gates of the southern lock were placed, as were 4 in the northern lock. On 18 August the contractors started to allow water into the pit up to a level of 1.5 m below AOD. By then the four iron flood gates for the sluice had not yet been installed. By September 1871 most of the work was finished. 18,000,000 bricks and about 1,000 m^{3} of stone had been put in place. At the time there was still an opening in the dike south of the pit, which allowed ships to pass freely.

By October 1871 the contractors were busy to close the dam south of the Pit of Schellingwoude. Many people in Amsterdam then got worried about whether the pumping station at the Oranje Locks would have enough capacity to drain the IJ. If not, the canals of Amsterdam would not be able to clear the sewage of the city. This would not be a problem once the locks/sluices at the North Sea side became operational. By late October 1871, all lock gates had been placed.

=== Characteristics of the locks as completed ===
The biggest of the three locks was 130 m long on the outside. The lock chamber was 96 m long between the sills and 18.05 m wide at AOD. The biggest pair of its iron gates weighed 72,000 kg. To prevent these doors from wearing down the brickwork below, the gates had air chambers. These reduced the weight to almost nothing in the water. The smaller locks at the sides of the big lock were 99.30 m long on the outside. Their lock chambers were 72.80 m long and 14.05 m wide at AOD. Each lock had 5 pairs of gates. At the Zuiderzee side a pair of flood and a pair ebb gates. The same on the IJ-side. In the middle of each lock was a single pair of flood gates, which divided the lock chamber in two sections. This allowed to use only part of a lock when traffic did not require use of the whole lock chamber.

South of the locks there was a regular sluice, i.e. without pumps. It was 35.50 m long and 10.05 m wide. Like the other sluices it had three pairs of gates. Of course this sluice was not suitable for the passage of ships, but it sometimes happened by accident.

North of the locks were three narrow sluices with a pumping station on top. Each of these sluices was 40.00 m long and 4.00 m wide. The pumping station was designed and built by Easton, Amos and Sons. Each sluice had a pair of steam engines of 75 ihp, and a horizontal Appold's centrifugal pump. The pumps could drain 2,000 m^{3} of water per minute.

=== Operation of the locks ===
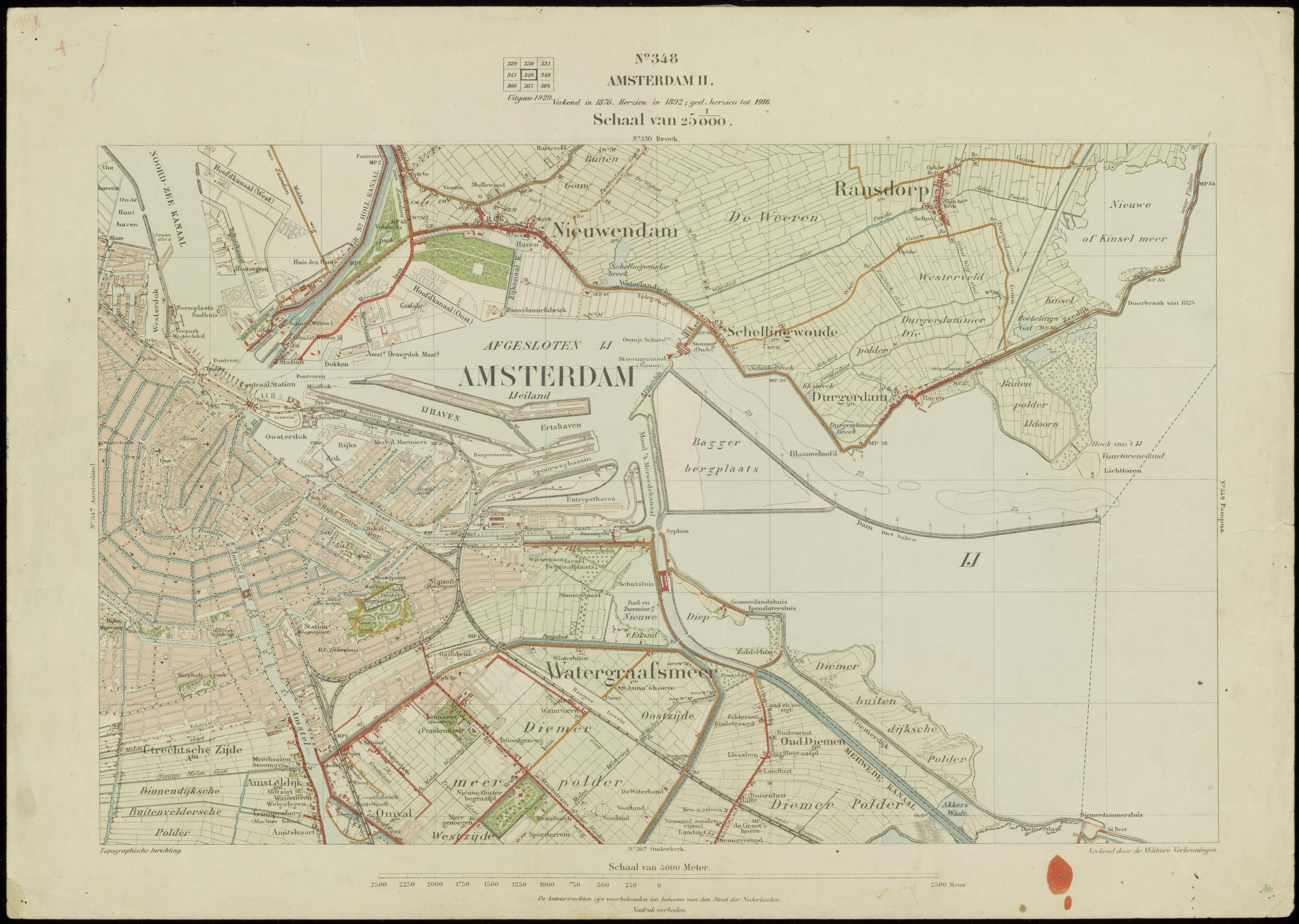
1916 map

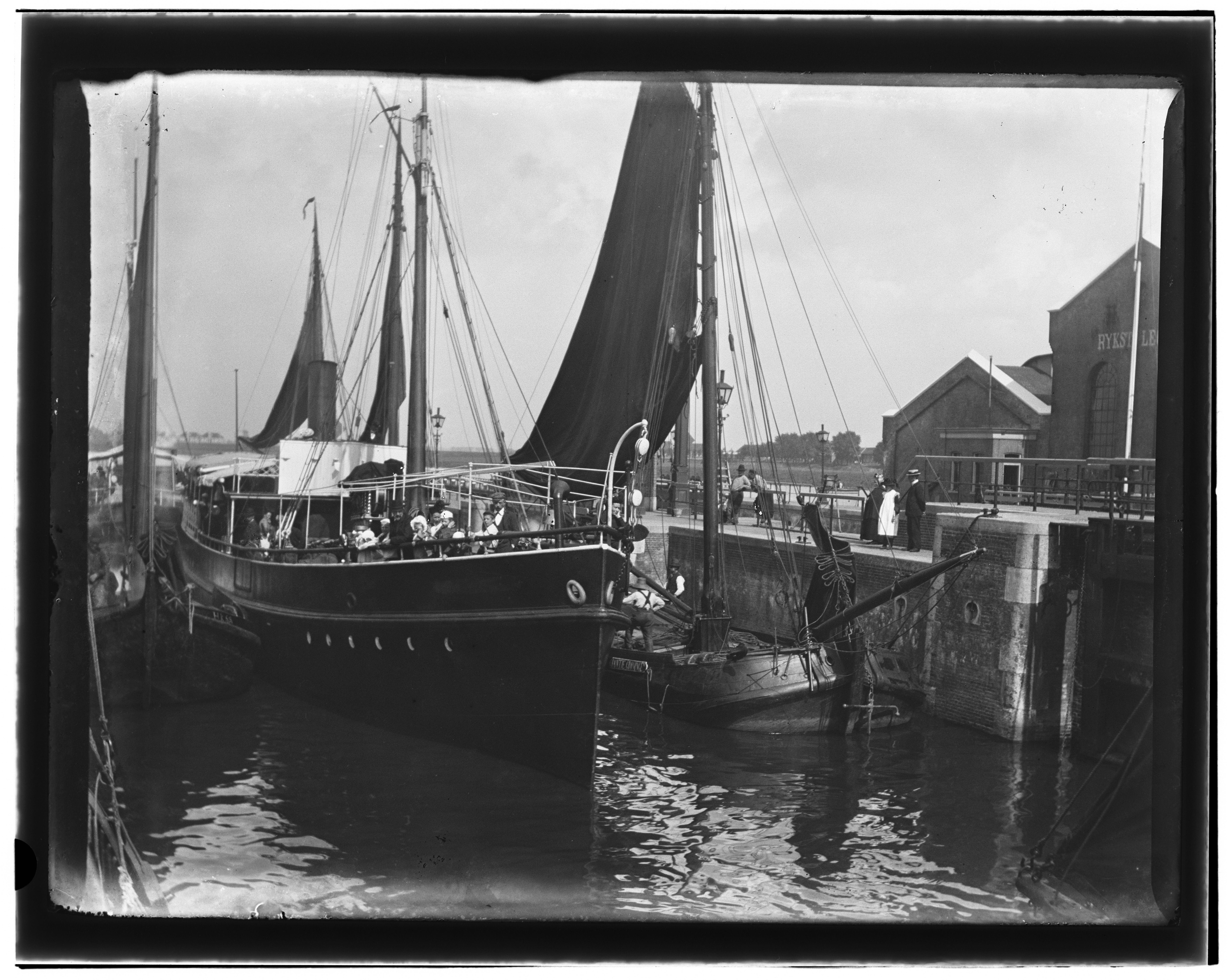
One of the Oranje Locks in 1904

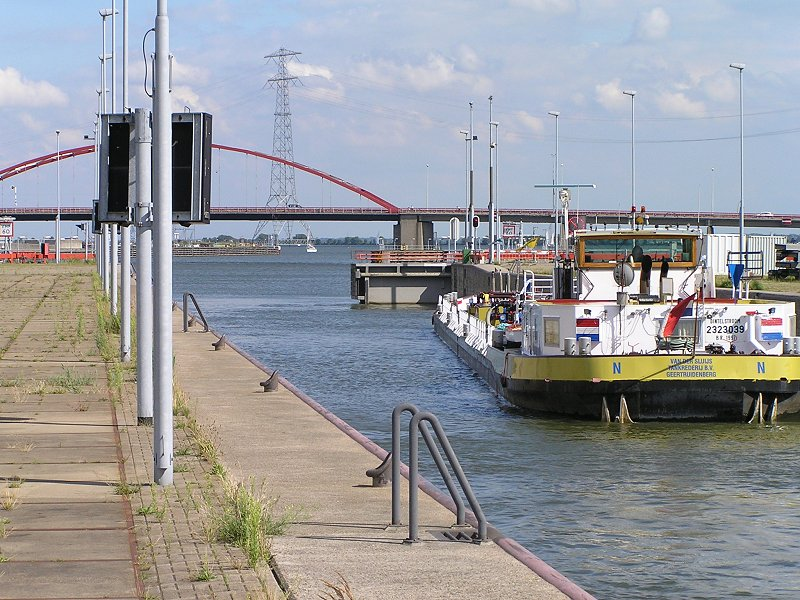
Prins Willem Alexander Lock in 2005

On 18 March 1872 at 6 AM the Boeier (a traditional yacht) Ondine of Mr. Coers was the first vessel to pass the Oranje Locks. In May 1872 2,792 vessels passed the locks, i.e.: 5 barques, 12 brigs, 35 schooners, 16 koffs, 40 steam paddle ships, 133 steam screw ships, 2,222 single-masted sailing vessels or barges, and 329 other vessels. In June 6,758 vessels used the locks, in July 9,631, in August 12,218, in September 10,811. On 4 June 1872, the dike through the IJ was closed, meaning the last section rose above the water level. The hurry with regard to the locks, and the closure of the dike south of it, was also caused by a contractual obligation to close the IJ by 1 November 1872.

In the first months of operation there were many complaints about missing facilities, especially those that allowed vessels to safely come to a halt or anchor before the locks. One vessel was indeed caught by the currents, and flushed through the sluice just south of the three locks. It sank shortly after passage. On 12 April the king visited the locks, being rowed there in the royal boat. After fierce debates, the conclusion was that the locks were unsafe at the IJ side, because of their dual character as locks and sluice. Indeed, the northernmost of the three locks was often used as a sluice. All this drainage caused very strong currents around the locks, and therefore a wish for strong works that could prevent vessels from being caught by these currents. The first of these works were made in 1872. More of these were tendered for 158,400 guilders in 1873. See the maps and photographs for the extent of these works.

On 1 November 1876 the North Sea Canal was opened. In July 1877 the locks of the North Sea Canal serviced: 61 frigates and barques, 18 brigs, 21 schooners, 2 koffs, 147 screw steamers, and 224 fisherman. At the Oranje Locks these numbers were: 6 barques, 4 brigs, 15 schooners, 8 koffs, 202 steam peddle ships, 679 screw steamers, 4,889 single-masted sailing vessels and barges, 3,574 fishermen and 1,566 other vessels.

=== Old Pumping station ===
After construction of the North Sea Canal, the level of the IJ would have to be kept at 0.50 m below AOD. With the sea at IJmuiden generally at that level at ebb, a significant portion of this drainage could be done via the locks over there. However, this would not be enough, and so drainage relied on the Orange Locks and its pumping station. This pumping station did not suffice, and was very uneconomical in use. In 1895 it was replaced by a new pumping station south of the locks. However, the old station, with its worn out boilers was not immediately demolished. It seems that in 1912 it was still standing. In 1947 it was the office of the lock master and was used for storage. In 1984 the building of the old pumping station was still standing. The building has since been demolished. Parts of the sluices are still visible.

=== New Pumping station ===
In 1890 plans for a new pumping station south of the locks were finalized. In December 1895 the new pumping station was ready. It employed a scoop wheel, which was in line with the relatively modest difference in water levels between the IJ and the Zuiderzee. The new pumping station proved efficient, and more powerful than was previously thought. After World War II it fell into disuse for 23 years. In 1968 there were plans to put it to use again, now with a Diesel engine. It seems that work actually started, but nothing came of it.

=== The Afsluitdijk (1932) ===
The Afsluitdijk which cut off the Zuiderzee from the North Sea, was constructed from 1927 till 1932. For the Oranje Locks it meant that the dam in which they were located lost its name to the new dike. For some time, it even seemed possible that the whole works would be demolished. In 1922 the cost for demolishing the whole was estimated at 3,000,000 guilders.

=== Post World War II ===
By the 1950s the Oranje Locks were very outdated, and could hardly handle the increased traffic of ever larger inland ships. There was a desire to remove the dam and locks, but in case of trouble this would require a pumping station of unheard of capacity. Meanwhile, the many plans that would have led to the removal of the Oranje Locks probably led to them not getting modernized. In 1971 80,000 vessels passed the locks, but they were still operated by hand, requiring 42 employees. In 1972 it was announced that the locks would be automated.

=== Monument ===
In 1979 the Oranje Locks were listed as a national monument. Rijkswaterstaat objected, and in 1984 the Oranje Locks were removed from the list. One of the reasons for delisting was that the Oranje Locks southern pumping station had pumping station Cruquius as a competitor. In 1990 the southern pumping station was demolished. Parts of the machinery were transported to the Dutch Steam Engineer Museum.

=== Construction of Prins Willem-Alexander Lock ===
During the 1970s and 1980s increased recreational traffic made the Oranje Locks even more busy. This often led to long delays and dangerous situations. In part because amateurs and professionals were using the same locks, and commercial ships had become very big. (See the 2009 photo of the locks.) These developments made that a new lock, solely meant for commercial traffic was built. This is the Prins Willem-Alexander Lock, opened in 1995. In December 1996 a thorough renovation of the Oranje Locks proper started. This renovation was finished in 2000.
