= Westerdok =

- Westerdok (Dutch)
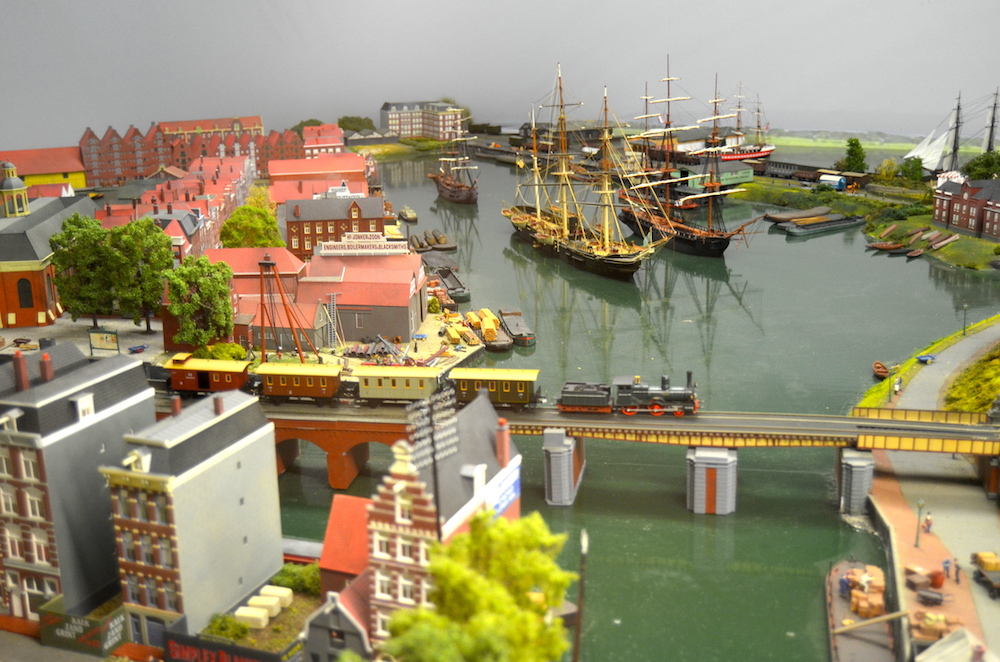
- Model of the Westerdok in 1889

- Location within Amsterdam
- 52.385669°N 4.890928°E
- Location: Amsterdam

History
- Built: 1834

Westerdok (Western Dock) is a former wet dock in Amsterdam. It was created in 1830–1834 by constructing the Westerdoksdam and Westerdoksluis, forming a reliable deep port closed off from the tidal IJ. It lost its function in 1876 when the North Sea Canal was opened. About half of it has since been filled up.

== History ==
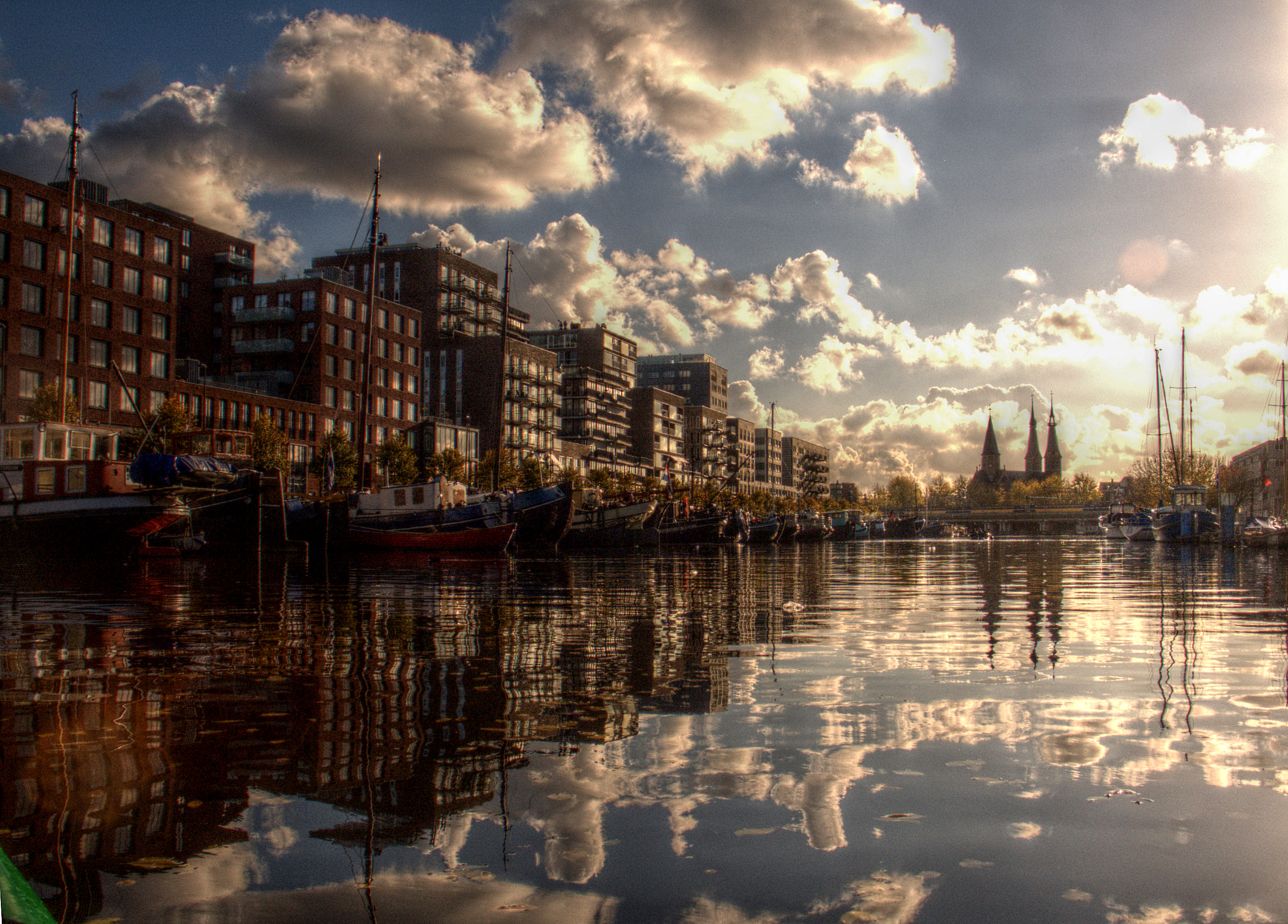
Westerdok in 2012

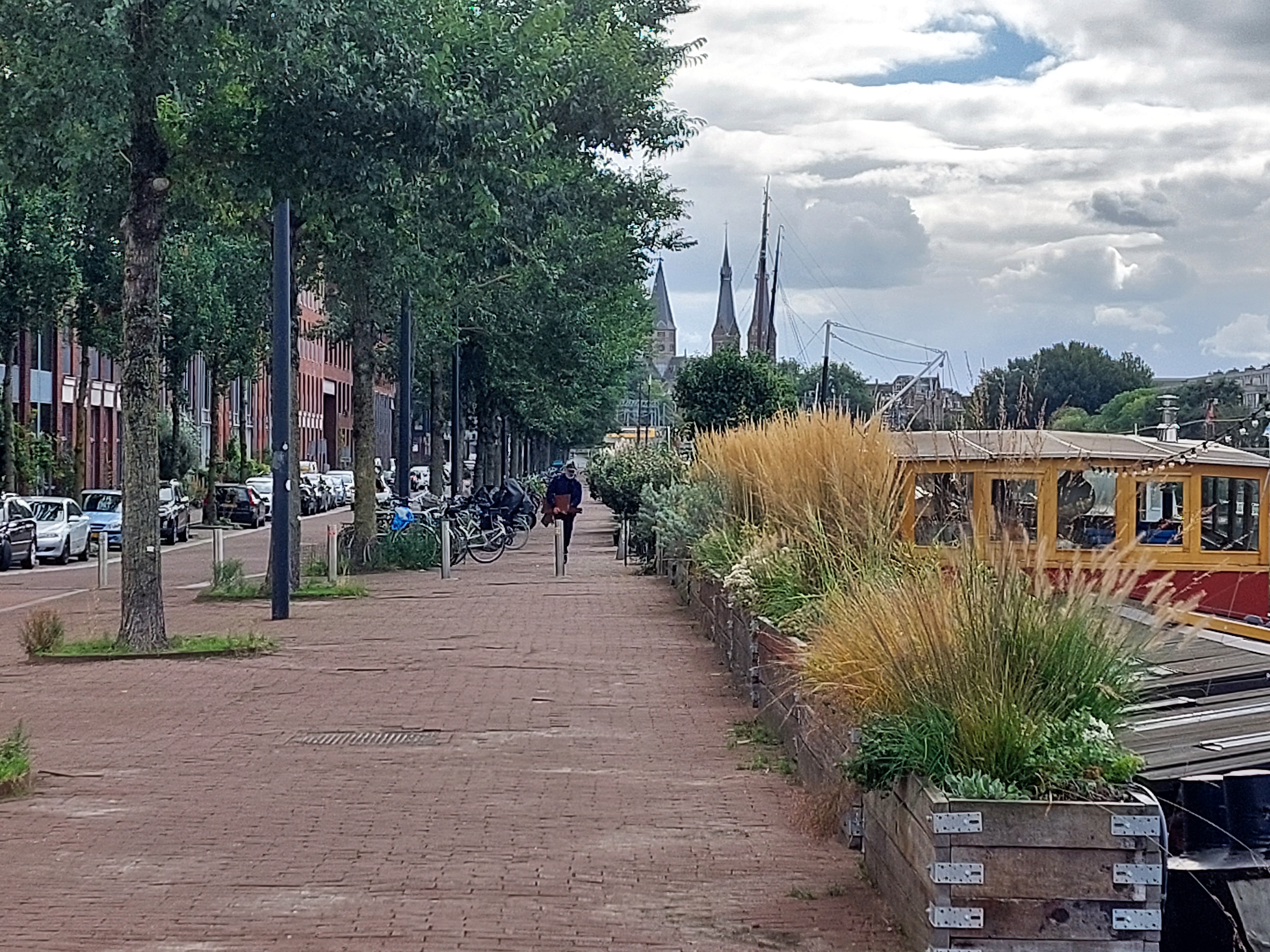
Westerdok the street.

=== Context ===
The construction of the wet dock Westerdok came about by the gradual silting up of the harbor of Amsterdam. For this background and the plans to build the Westerdok, see Oosterdok.

=== Construction ===
The Westerdoksdam was a 2,010 m long dyke constructed through the IJ from the west bank of the Haarlemmersluis in the Martelaarsgracht to the Spaarndammerdijk. By July 1831, this dyke around the dock gave cover to ships lying in the proposed wet dock, but was far from complete. By July 1834 the dyke was almost finished, an openinghad been left to allow shipping till the Westerdok Lock was completed.

The foundation of the Westerdok Lock (Westerdoksluis) were started in 1830. The first pile was driven in on 21 July 1830. Work on the foundations were delayed by weak and shifting grounds. The commemorative stone of the lock was set on 19 September 1832. The lock was first used on 19 September 1834, opening the Westerdok.

=== Early significance as a harbor and wet dock ===
The Westerdok was a wet dock. It meant that inside the area closed off by the Westerdok Lock, the water level remained more or less constant. I.e. it was not influenced by the tides. The dock was also dredged out, so the largest Dutch ships could use it. The wet dock was very beneficial for shipping, because ships could much easier transload to boats and barges.

On the Westerdok about a dozen shipyards were situated on Bickerseiland. These profited by being able to launch bigger ships. Also on Bickerseiland was the sugar refinery Java of the Amsterdamsche Stoom Suikerraffinaderij. This would get a pier which allowed direct loading and unloading from ships in the Westerdok. The refinery burned down in 1874 and was not rebuilt.

A special feature of the Westerdok was Drydock II of the Rederij der Drijvende Droogdokken, a company that provided service by floating dry docks.

== Decline of the port ==
=== The North Sea Canal ===
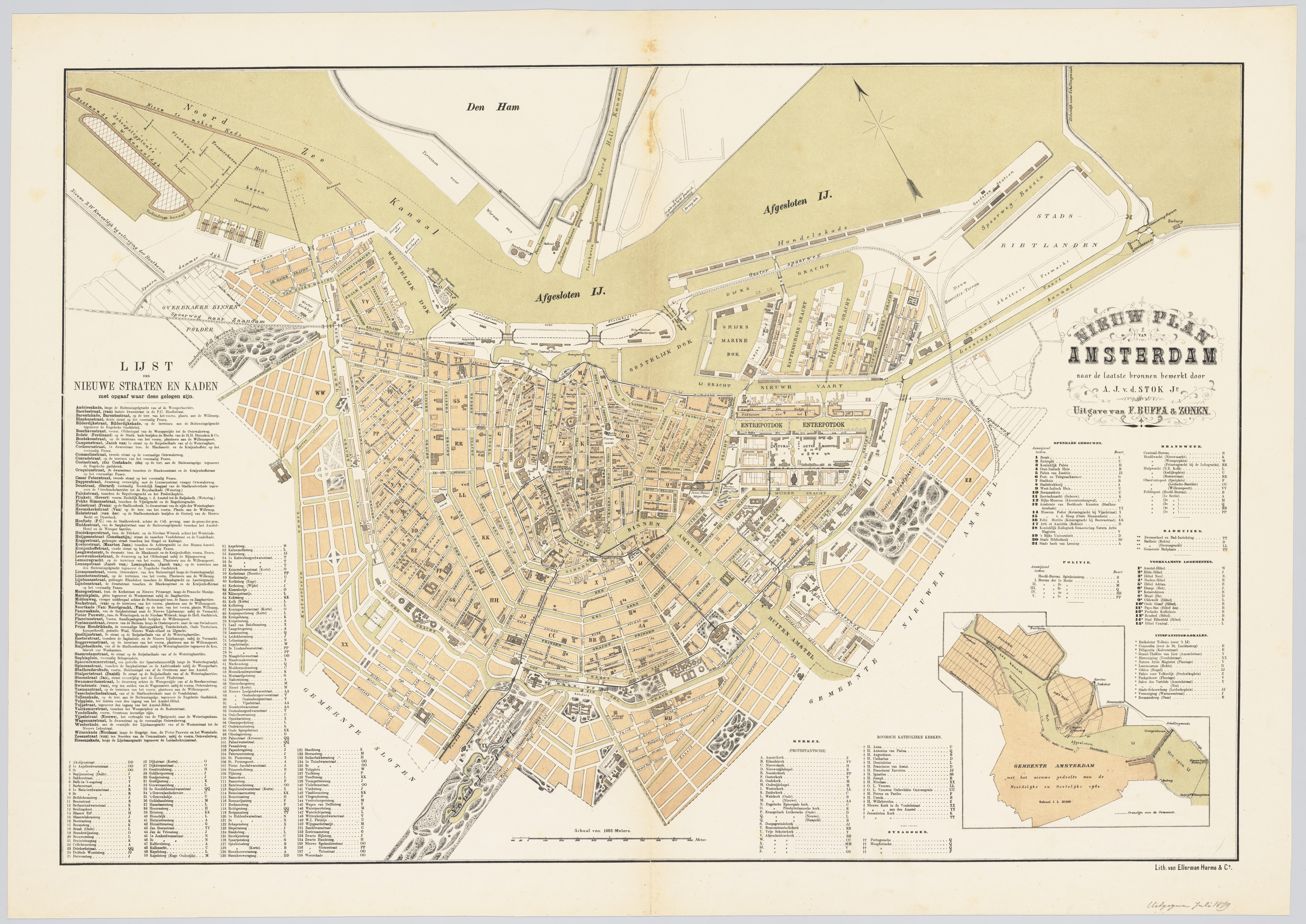
Railway closing in c. 1884

The North Sea Canal was constructed between 1865 and 1876. Part of its construction was the closure of the IJ on the east side by building the Oranje Locks. It meant that the whole IJ got the same characteristics as the Westerdok wet dock. Instead of protecting a safe harbor, the Westerdok Lock became an impediment to ships that wanted to unload in Amsterdam.

While the North Sea Canal would ultimately make the Westerdok obsolete, this was not the case for the Westerdoksdam. When the North Sea Canal was constructed, this dyke got some piers at which large ships could attach directly, instead of transloading to barges. This was a huge cost saver, which became even more significant when a cargo railway was constructed. This railway used a bridge over the Westerdok Lock, see 1884 map.

=== Encroaching railways ===
In 1869 the municipal council of Amsterdam agreed with the government proposal to construct the future Amsterdam Centraal station on an island in the IJ between Westerdok and Oosterdok. In 1869 the municipal council of Amsterdam agreed to this location. For the Westerdok, the railway plan was not so problematic as for the Oosterdok, because the main line lay south of the dock. The damage that the railway caused, was that the part of the dock east of a line between the Prinsengracht and the Westerdock was filled up to build the temporary Station Amsterdam Westerdok, a large railway roundhouse, and a classification yard.

By the 1910s, the Westerdok was no longer significant for shipping. The only use was by small coal barges and ships that came to repair at the Jonker and Suyver shipyards. The side of the Westerdok dyke that faced the IJ did remain important. The railways then decided to expand the central station, and to create Westerdokseiland, upon which a new classification yard would be constructed. A large part of the Westerdok was filled up with 650,000 m^{3} of sand. What was left of the Westerdok was a broad canal of 100 m width. Along the new quay, the street Westerdok was constructed.

== Current use ==
The current, much smaller Westerdok is home to many rather large barges that are used as houseboats. There is also a small marina.
