= Oosterdok =

- Oosterdok (Dutch)
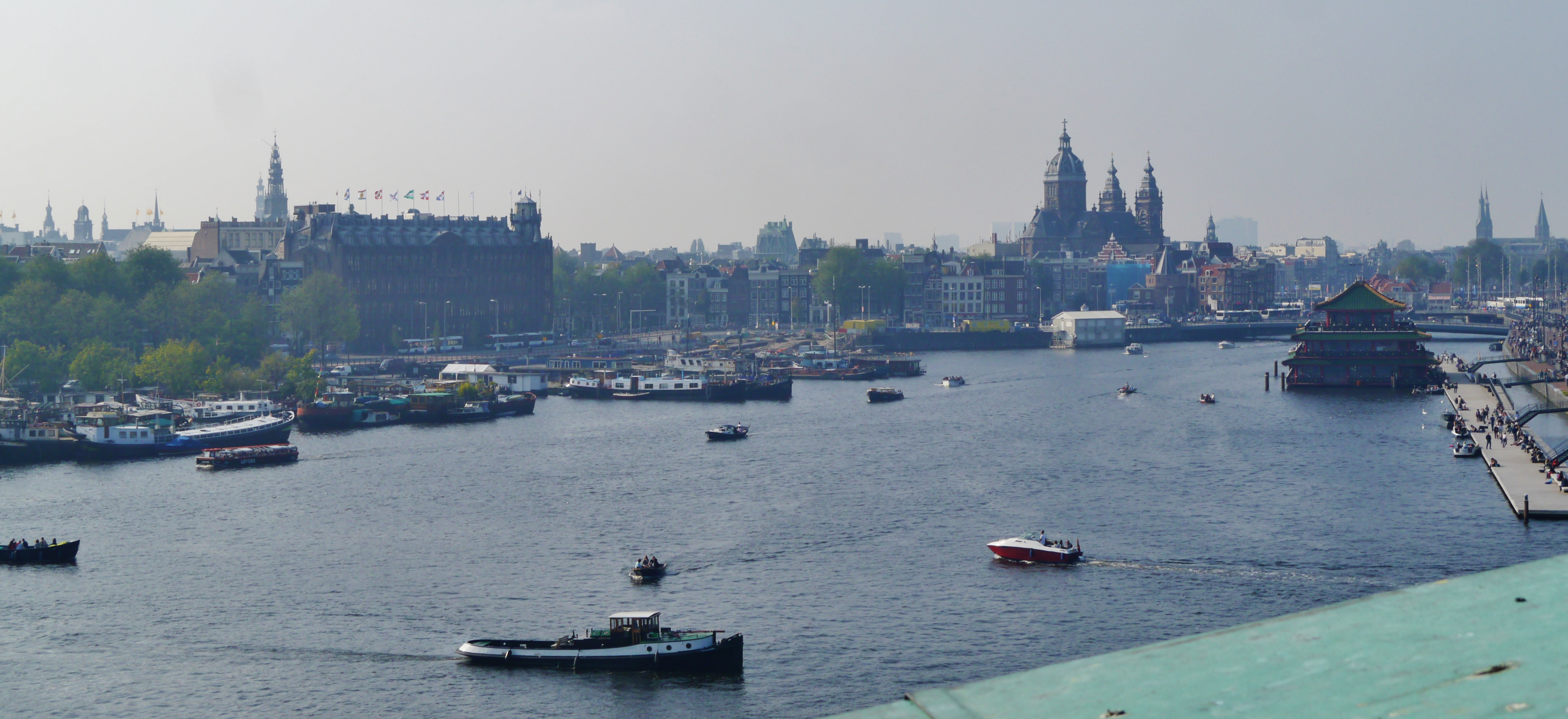
- Oosterdok towards the west, seen from the roof of NEMO

- Location within Amsterdam
- 52.373930°N 4.913197°E
- Location: Amsterdam

History
- Built: 1832

The Oosterdok ('Eastern Dock') is a former wet dock in Amsterdam. It was created in 1831–1832 by constructing the Oosterdoksdam and the Oosterdoksluis, forming a reliable deep port closed off from the tidal IJ.

== Context ==
=== Silting up of Amsterdam harbor ===
The harbor of Amsterdam was basically a place were ships could conveniently anchor on the IJ, immediately before the city. Here smaller ships could attach to a series of interconnected mooring poles called De Laag. Larger ships anchored at a small distance from De Laag. There were docks immediately connected to the city, but these were open to the tides. Larger ships did not attach to a quay to unload, but transloaded goods on boats that brought these into the city via the many canals.

The approaches to the harbor of Amsterdam suffered from silting up. The most serious problem were the shallows near the island of Pampus in the Zuiderzee. After the French period, King William I of the Netherlands attempted to revitalize the Dutch economy by improving land- and waterways. One of these was the Noordhollandsch Kanaal, which was dug from Amsterdam to Nieuwediep (Den Helder) between 1820 and 1824.

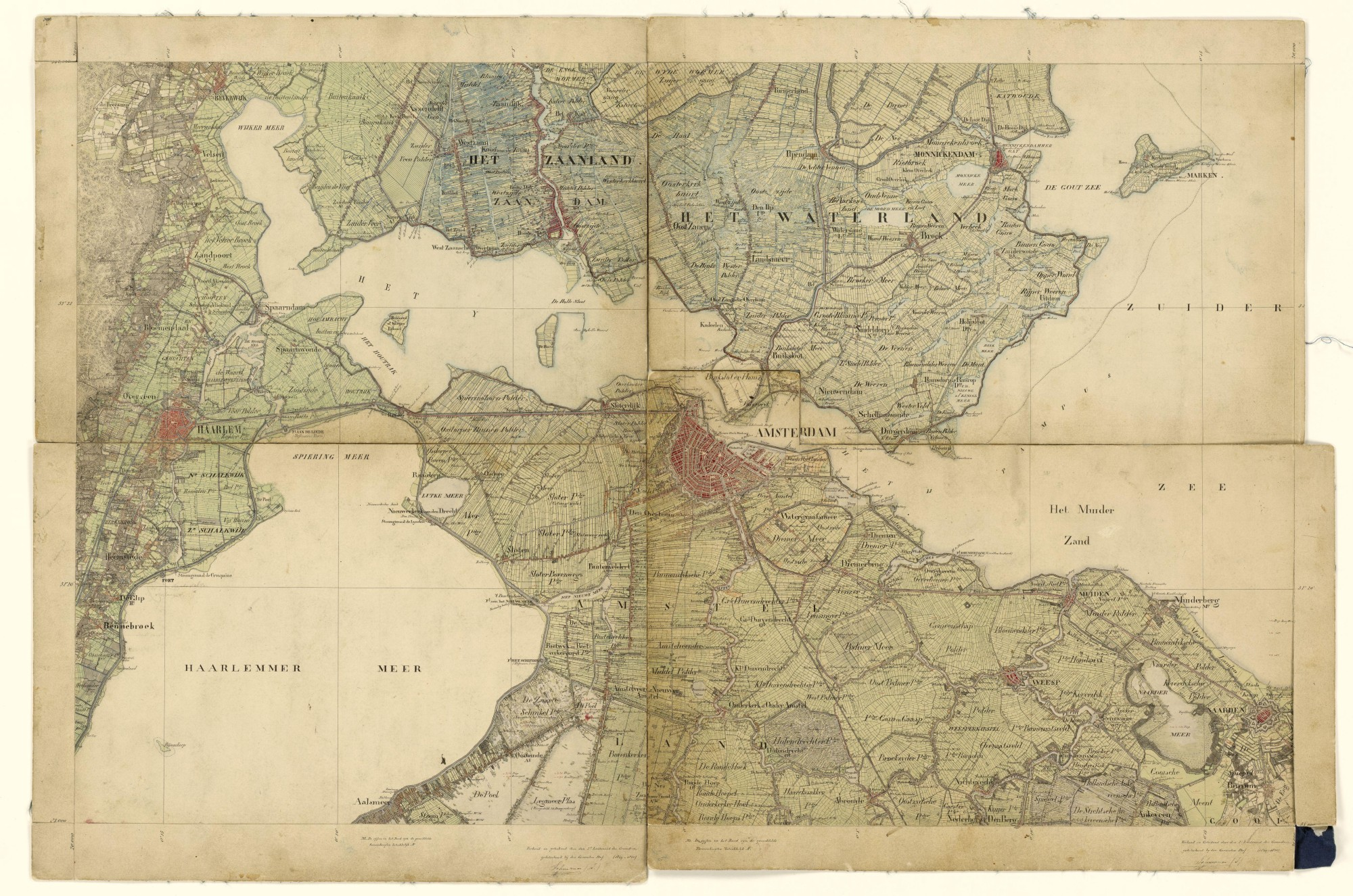
1850 map with Goudriaan Canal and Oosterdok

Oosterdok Wet Dock in 1841

The Amsterdam harbor gradually became unsuitable for big ships. Ships also suffered damage from anchoring before Amsterdam. This was caused by the bow and stern cutting into soft clay below the keel at ebb. The center of the ship would cut less deeply into the underground, and therefore supported the ship at ebb, causing the so-called katterug (cat's spine, or cat pose). The unsuitability of the harbor meant that ships had to anchor further away.

By the late 18th century the situation had become rather desperate. At that time, the navigable part of the IJ consisted of a trench of about 400 m wide and 7–12 m deep. The 'harbor' of Amsterdam was a mud bank south of this trench, with a depth of slightly more than a meter. Therefore only small vessels could use the harbor. Ships had to unload at considerable distance. During a neap tide with a harsh south or south west wind, the harbor would occasionally go completely dry.

The inhabitants of Amsterdam knew that in the past, vessels sailing to nearby European ports had anchored in the center of the city, at the Damrak. When efforts to remedy the problem by dredging had failed, they turned to science. In 1775 Jan van Houweningen suggested to give the shores of the IJ before the city a more regular profile, so the currents would increase, instead of being slowed by the many works present. This idea was not executed.

In 1805 the Koninklijke Hollandsche Maatschappij der Wetenschappen offered a double gold medal in a contest to solve the problem. The contestant had to prove the causes of the silting up of the Amsterdam harbor, and propose a way to remedy this problem. Jan Blanken, the engineer who later designed the Noordhollandsch Kanaal won the contest.

=== Plans for a wet dock ===
Blanken's idea was rather original. Instead of trying to remedy the situation by attempting to move the currents closer to the city, he proposed to bring the city closer to the currents. Blanken proposed to lay a dam on the southern side of the IJ, north of the Laag. This would create a single large wet dock in front of the city. The plan was about to be put in motion when the French Empire fell in 1813.

After national independence was restored, the plan was again proposed to the city in 1818. The city preferred to first undertake a costly major dredging attempt for five years. By 1828 it was clear that nothing had been gained by dredging.

There were two reasons to create the Amsterdam wet docks. The first was the traditional reason to construct a wet dock, i.e. to offer a safe and deep mooring place by maintaining the high tide level inside the wet dock. This could also enable large ships to unload directly to a quay, but this probably did not happen in the Oosterdok. Nevertheless, a wet dock would still ease transloading because the water would be calmer, and transloading would hardly be interrupted. This would still strengthen the competitive position of Amsterdam. For Amsterdam this traditional reason was not that relevant. The lack of a deep harbor was caused by silting up, not by a tidal range. In Amsterdam, the construction of a wet dock only to maintain the high tide, would not result in a deep harbor.

From the above it is clear that the primary reason to construct the Amsterdam wet docks, was that their dykes would put an end to the very irregular shore line of Amsterdam at the IJ, and would keep the sediment out of the harbor. It was generally agreed that the many canals opening on the IJ, the many mooring poles, De Laag, and the many ships at anchor, were responsible for the quick accumulation of sediment before the city. It was hoped that the dykes of the wet docks would allow the sediment to flow back towards the Zuiderzee. The concentration of the drainage of the Amstel between the docks would also make it easier to keep the final trench to Amsterdam deep enough.

=== The government attempts to close off the IJ ===
The government of Amsterdam resisted the changed wet dock plans. The government then started the realization of the Goudriaan Canal. This was dug from 1826 to 1828 to circumvent the Pampus shallows, but not completed. The 1850 map shows the outline of this canal through Marken Island, and then through Waterland towards the IJ.

In the end the city ceased to resist, because the Goudriaan plan also included the closure of the IJ on the Zuiderzee side. The city government then proposed to the king that the plan for the wet docks should be executed instead. On 10 March 1828 the king agreed, stopped the Goudriaan plan, and mandated Amsterdam to execute a revised version of Blanken's 1808 plan for the wet docks. The national government would facilitate a loan to cover the cost.

== History ==
=== Construction of Oosterdok ===
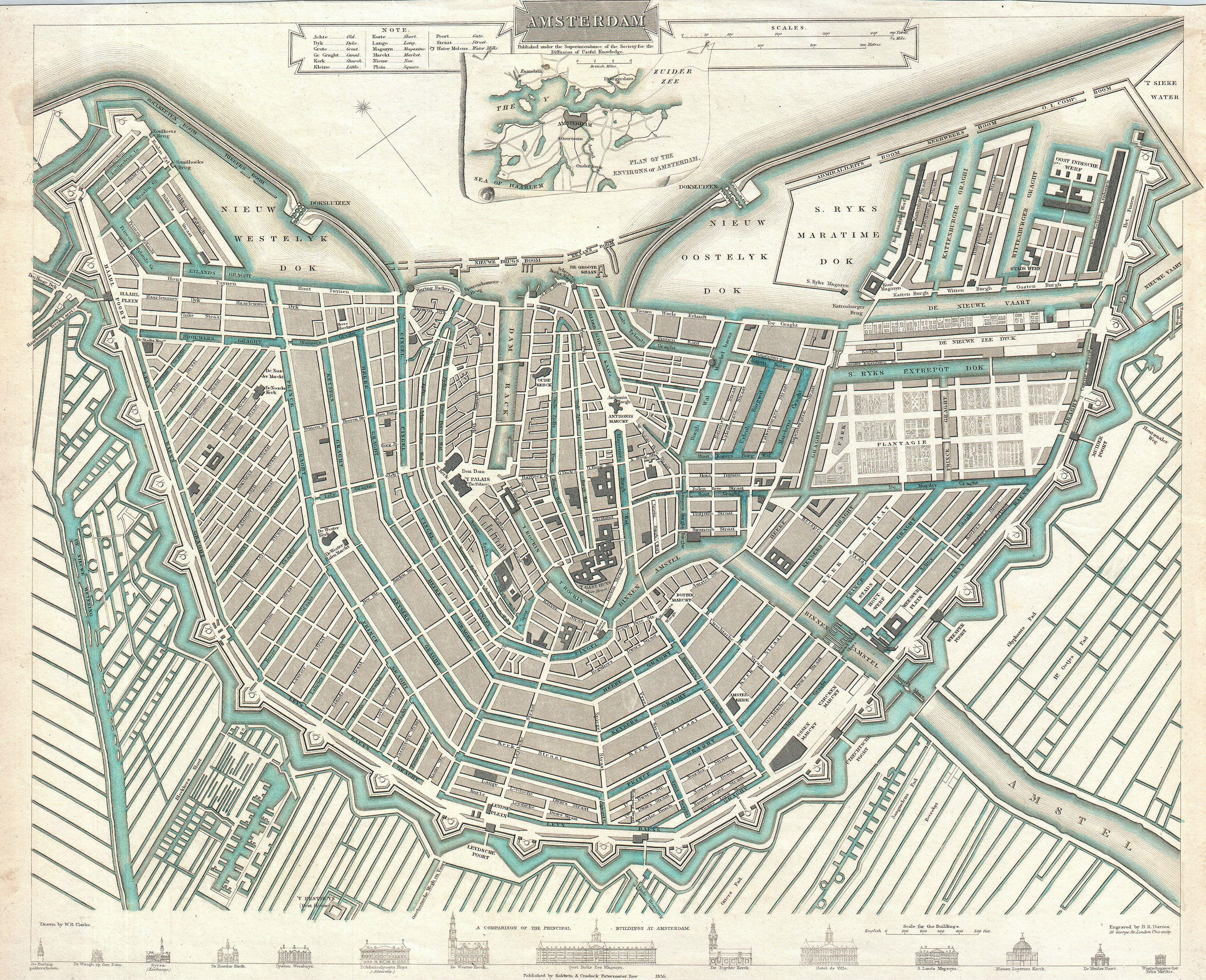
1835 city map with 'Nieuw Oostelijk Dok'

Construction of the Oosterdok started in May 1828. It was led by C.W.M. Klijn, director of the city maritime construction department (Stads Waterwerken). The first part was a 4,194 m long dyke through the IJ from its western end near Kraansluis (Kraan Lock) to the Diemerdijk near Zeeburg in the east. The 1850 map (above) shows that this dyke enclosed the area of the Oosterdok, and an area to the east of about equals size, the Stads Rietlanden.

The dyke was located somewhat before the old mooring points Admiraliteits Boom, Keerweeers Boom, O.I. Compagnie Boom, which came to lay inside the Oosterdok. The dyke enclosed the islands Kattenburgh, Wittenburgh, and Oostenburgh, which lay north of the previous dyke, which was still called Nieuwe Zeedijk (new sea dyke). The western end of this dyke was until recently called Oosterdam. It was removed in the late 2010s in order to improve the visual quality of the area.

The Oosterdoksluis (Oosterdok Lock) would give access to the Oosterdok from the IJ. Foundation work for the lock started before the first stone was laid by on 11 June 1830 by Prince Willem, the later King William III. It was a double lock, the small lock was finished early. The big lock for ocean-going ships was opened with solemn festivities in 1832.

=== Significance of the Oosterdok ===
The Marine Etablissement, with the prominent 's Lands Zeemagazijn, now National Maritime Museum, occupied about half of Kattenburgh Island. It is still a Dutch Army/Navy Base. During the French period, it became less important as a navy base, and more important as the location of Rijkswerf Amsterdam. The Rijkswerf would remain the most important shipyard for construction of Dutch warships, until it was closed down in 1915. The site then continued as Marine Etablissement.

Oostenburgh Island used to be home to the operations of the Amsterdam Division of the Dutch East India Company. Here its gigantic warehouse Oost-Indisch Zeemagazijn had collapsed in April 1822. The terrain of its shipyard was soon after acquired by Van Vlissingen en Dudok van Heel. The ropewalk followed later. Van Vlissingen en Dudok van Heel would become the biggest private enterprise of Amsterdam. Its machine factory was continued by Werkspoor.

Van Vlissingen's shipbuilding activities would be restarted by the Nederlandsche Scheepsbouw Maatschappij, which was active on Conradstreet from 1894 till the mid 1920s, and then continued on the other side of the IJ. The Kattenburgervaart and Nieuwe Vaart were home to many other Amsterdam shipyards.

At the Oosterdok's southern side was Rapenburg Lock. This gave access to the Entrepotdok, a vast enclosed complex of warehouses. The oldest of these warehouses dated from 1708, but when the complex was designated as a national warehouse for transit goods (Algemeen Rijksentrepot) in April 1827, many more were constructed. The close by Entrepotdok added to the attraction of Oosterdok, because ships could unload to these warehouses without having to pay import duties. These were only levied if the goods later entered the Dutch market. In 1890 a new transit dock was opened just east of the Oosterdok. This was connected to the IJ and the Merwede Canal, now the northern part of the Amsterdam–Rhine Canal.

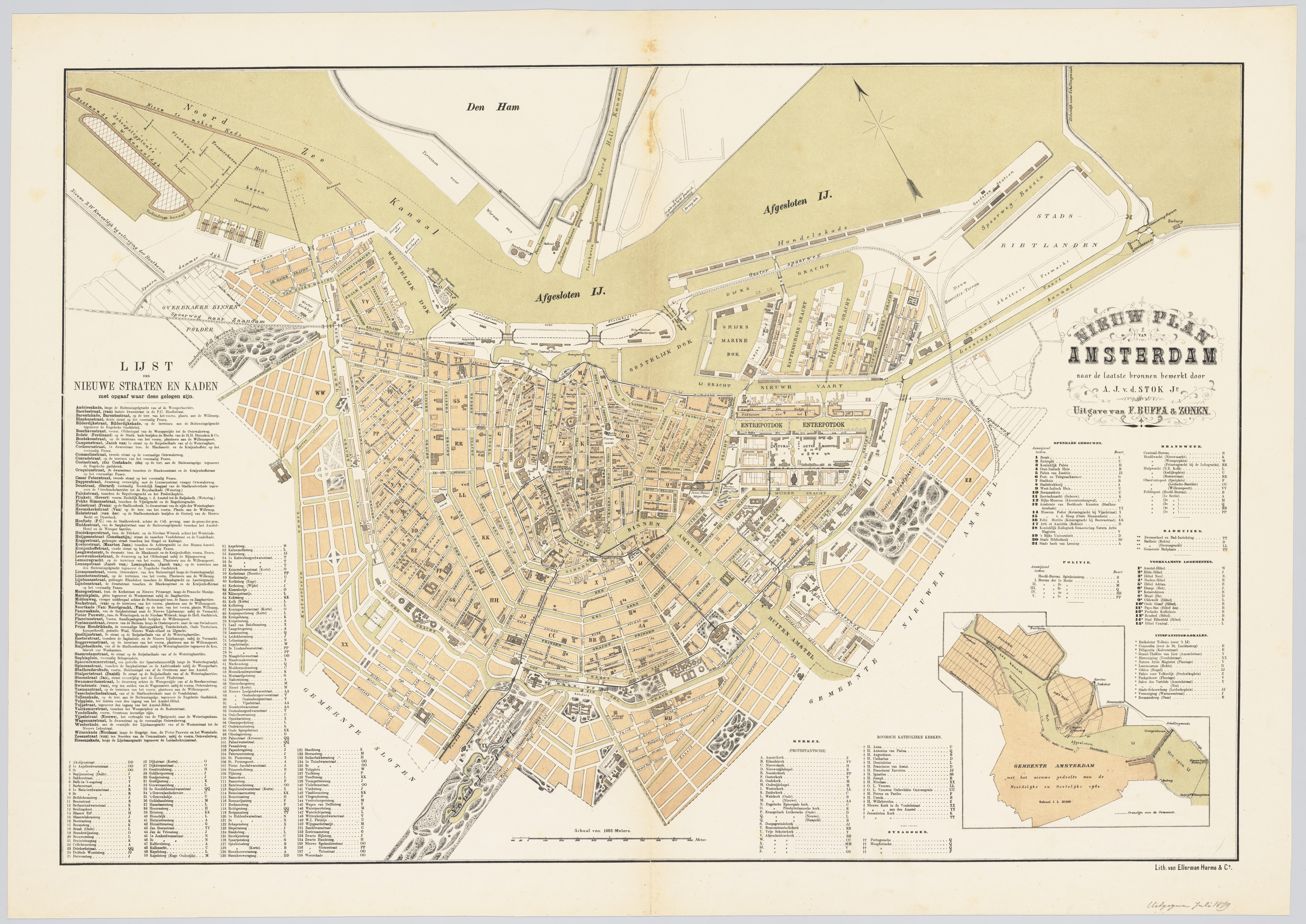
Closed off IJ, competing railway harbor and Handelskade c. 1884

The north eastern part of the wet dock is known by the name Dijksgracht. Here the Reederij der Drijvende Droogdokken (company for floating dry docks) opened the first wooden dry dock of Amsterdam in 1842. This was an essential facility for the maintenance of more modern ships, especially those that had copper sheathing. Soon two other wooden dry docks joined the first.

=== Railroads ===
The Oosterdokseiland came into existence when it was decided to construct the future Amsterdam Centraal station on an island in the IJ between Westerdok and Oosterdok. In 1869 the municipal council of Amsterdam agreed on this location. It led to the construction of Oosterdokseiland. Most of it was made on the outside of the dyke surrounding Oosterdok, but there was also a significant part constructed inside the dock. In 1874 the Amsterdam–Zutphen railway was opened, which started at the temporary Oosterdok station on Oosterdokseiland.

In the same meeting that agreed on the main passenger station, the municipal council also agreed on a central station for cargo and coal. This was to be placed just east of the Oosterdok in the Stads Rietlanden. This would not be good for the Oosterdok. Therefore, the Amsterdam council also proposed a connection between the Nieuwe Vaart and the new harbor to the east.

== The North Sea Canal (1876) ==
The North Sea Canal, which opened in 1876, would be the doom of the Oosterdok. The new canal led to the closure of the IJ on its eastern side. With regard to the tides, it gave the whole IJ the characteristics of a wet dock. Therefore the old wet docks no longer had such a decisive advantage over the IJ with regard to unloading at a quay. To the contrary, both wet docks suffered from the disadvantage that ships had to cross the railroad in order to reach them. Railroad traffic soon increased to the point that ships had to wait till the late evening to cross into the Oosterdok.

Another effect of the North Sea Canal was that ships of a higher draft would reach Amsterdam. The canal would have a depth of 6.5 m below AOD in 1876 and 8.2 m in the early 1880s. The Oosterdok Lock had a depth of 6.3 m below AOD. SS Willem III, the first ship of the Netherland Line had a draft of 6.7 m. Therefore, the new ocean liners which would take over the trade to the East Indies from the sailing ships, would not unload in Oosterdok.

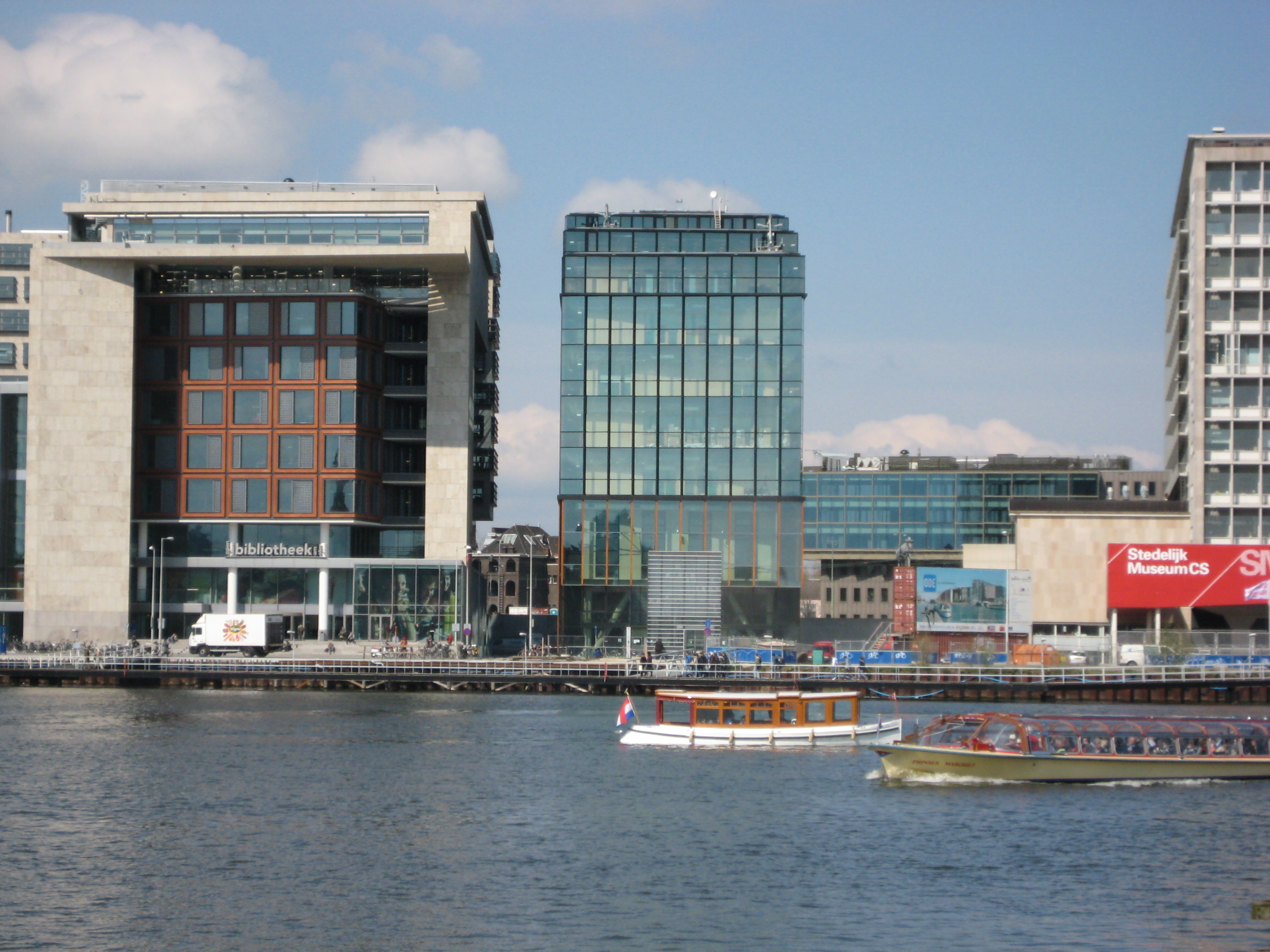
Amsterdam Public Library, Conservatoire, and part of museum on the Oosterdok

The next phase in the development of the port of Amsterdam was the Oostelijke Handelskade, a quay constructed on the northern side of the Oosterdok dyke. From the start, this was intended for big ships that would attach directly to the quay. At the quay, modern (steam or hydraulic) cranes would quickly unload the ship into warehouses without transloading. Later, the cargo could be re-loaded onto a train, wagon or into smaller ships. This procedure of first unloading to the warehouse, and then reloading on another means of transport, was advantageous because of the low cost of (steam)powered (un)loading. It enabled a ship to quickly be on its way again.

=== The 1960s ===
In the 1960s the IJtunnel was constructed. Its approach stretches through about two-thirds of the width of the dock, cutting it in two. This led to the demolishing of part of the Maritime Establishment and Navy Dock, notably the Het 'Paleis', the home for Navy officers. The construction of the IJtunnel also seriously damaged the appearance of the Oosterdok. At the time, there was not much noise about this loss. At about the same time, the large classification yard on Oosterdokseiland made room for a regional main post office.

== Attractions ==
=== Oosterdokseiland ===
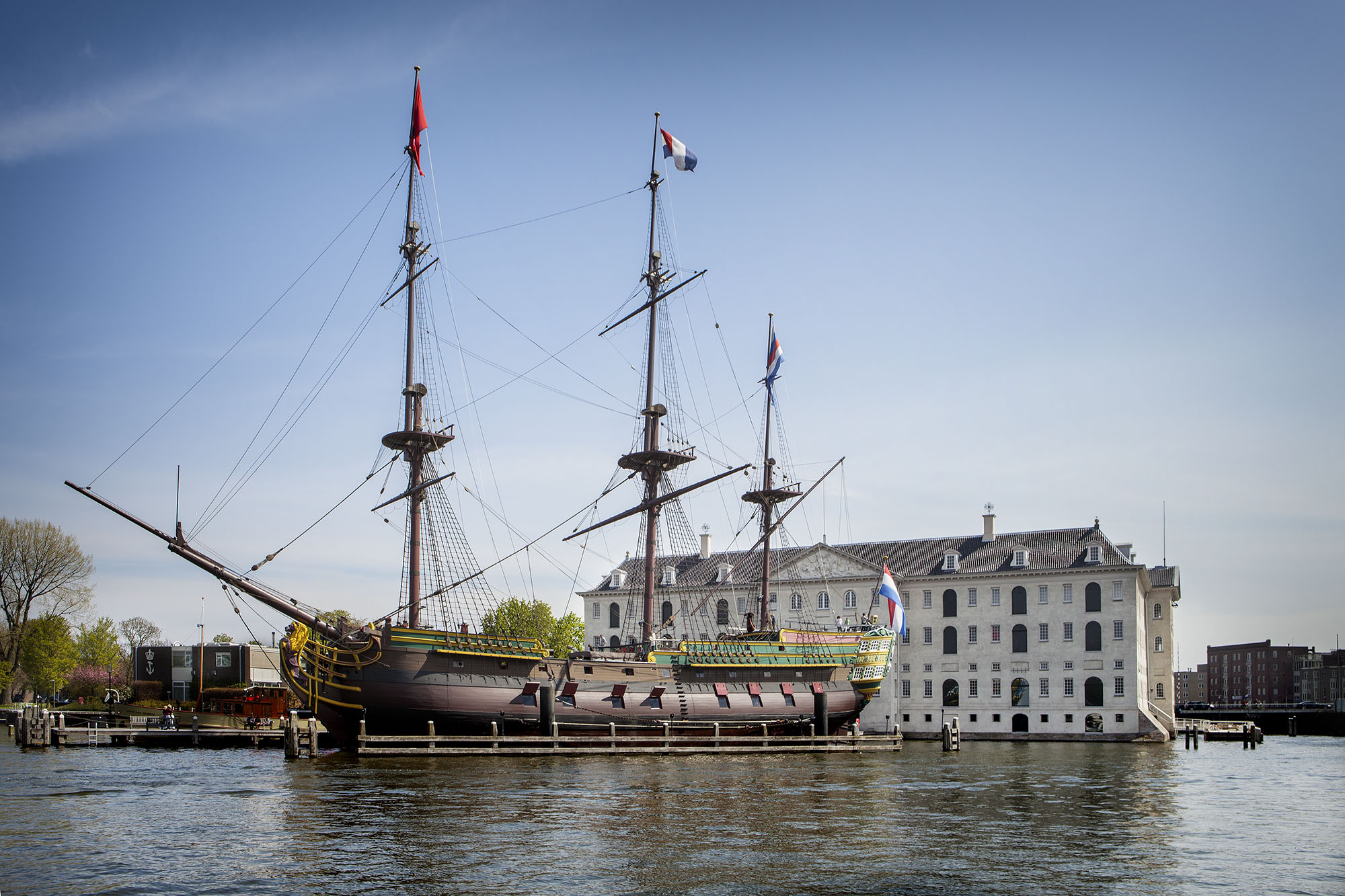
National Maritime Museum

On Oosterdokseiland a large part of the former Koninklijke PTT Nederland office was demolished in 2005. A tower that was preserved at first would house the Stedelijk Museum Amsterdam from 2003 to 2010. In 2007 the Amsterdam Public Library opened on Oosterdokseiland. In 2008 it was joined by the Conservatorium van Amsterdam The remaining tower of the PTT was demolished in 2010.

=== Center: National Maritime Museum and NEMO ===
The building's Lands Zeemagazijn (National Sea Arsenal) houses the National Maritime Museum since 1973. The replica of the East India Man Amsterdam is part of this museum. With the Ministry of Defense abandoning most of the terrain of the Maritime Establishment, the grounds of the Rijkswerf are not partly open to visitors. In 1997 the NEMO Science Museum was built on top of the foundations of the IJtunnel.

=== Oostenburg ===
On Oostenburg are the main buildings of the former ropeworks of the East India Company and the Admiralty. These are called Lijnbaan van de Verenigde Oost-Indische Compagnie and Admiraliteitslijnbaan. On Conradstraat the gate of the former Nederlandsche Scheepsbouw Maatschappij is still standing.
