= Koningsdok =

Former floating dry dock in Amsterdam, Netherlands

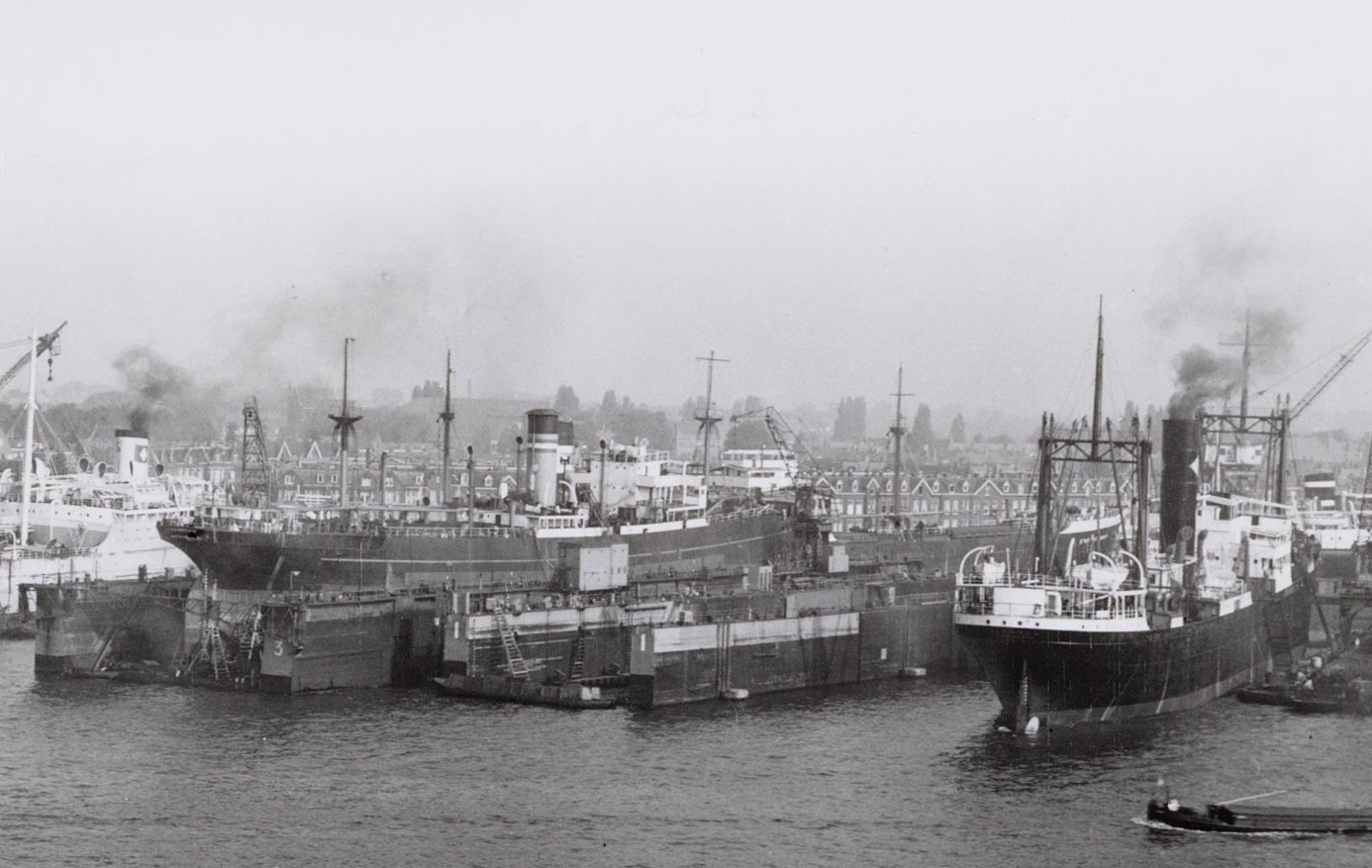
- View of ADM repair shipyard in 1955. In the center, the empty Koningsdok is marked with a '1'. Its sections are discernible because they are painted differently.

History

Netherlands
- Name: Koningsdok
- Namesake: William III of the Netherlands
- Cost: 380,000 guilders
- Launched: 19 September 1879
- Out of service: 2001
- Home port: Amsterdam (1879); Harlingen (1970)

General characteristics (as completed)
- Length: 123 m
- Beam: 22 m (outside); 17 m (inside)
- Draft: 5.50 m (on blocks)

Koningsdok was a floating dry dock in Amsterdam that was later moved to Den Oever and Harlingen. It was first known as the Von Lindern Dock. After the acquisition by ADM, it was known as Koningsdok and later also as 'Dock No. 1'.

From 1928 to 1932, a part of Koningsdok was rented out to the organization that managed the Zuiderzee Works. In 1970, a part of Koningsdok was acquired by shipyard Welgelegen in Harlingen. Later, the other part was also acquired by Welgelegen. At Welgelegen a long part served as Goliath Drydock until 1999. A smaller part served as David Drydock until 2001.

Koningsdok was of composite construction, i.e. steel covered with wood. It consisted of several sections that could be used separately. What is remarkable, is that this was actually done. In Amsterdam, the pieces were moored behind each other and operated as one or as multiple docks. In its final position in Harlingen, Goliath consisted of three parts of the dock, and David of one part.

== Context ==
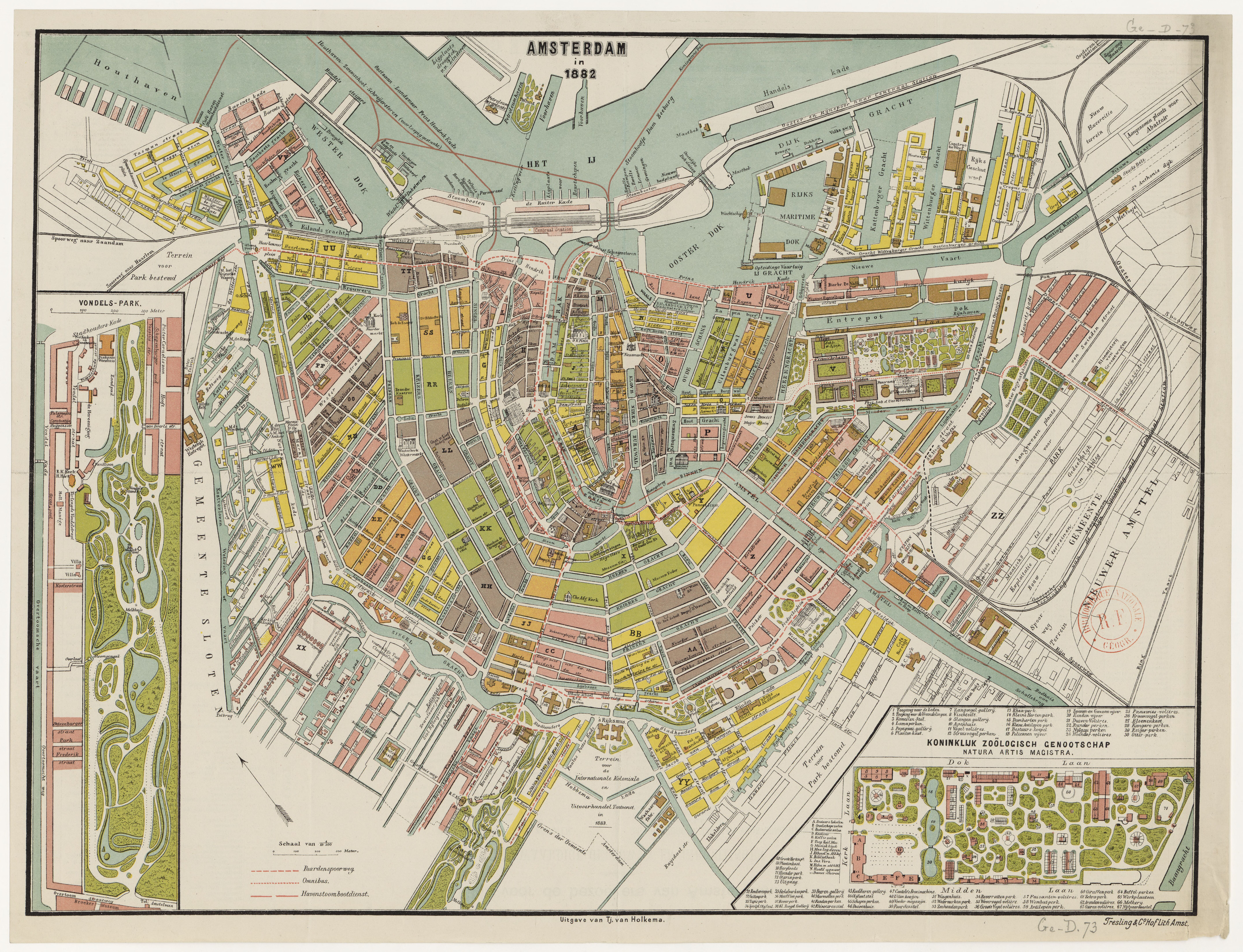
1882, Koningsdok marked as Ligplaats...Linderen

After regaining their independence in 1813, the Dutch built a new fleet of East Indiamen to trade with their far east colonies. In order to maintain these ships, four floating wooden drydocks were taken into use in Amsterdam from 1846 to 1857. The Suez Canal, which opened in 1869, made it economically feasible to use steamships in the trade to these colonies. In 1870, the Stoomvaart Maatschappij Nederland (SMN) was founded with an eye to this opportunity.

However, even the modest ocean liners of the early 1870s could not reach Amsterdam. Its connection to the North Sea, the Noordhollandsch Kanaal was simply too small. Therefore, SMN had to use the outport of Nieuwediep in its first years. The bright side of this was that the Dutch navy therefore allowed SMN to use its dry docks at Willemsoord. The construction of the North Sea Canal would change this. It was built from 1865 to 1876 and became suitable for ocean liners in October 1878.

SMN had an interest to establish dry docks capable of lifting ocean liners in Amsterdam. The vicinity of a dry dock would reduce the daily operational cost of its ships. In 1877, SMN supported the foundation of the Amsterdamsche Droogdok Maatschappij (ADM) by becoming its majority shareholder. ADM took its first floating dry dock, Koninginnedok into use in April 1879.

The other initiative to found a dry dock led to the foundation of the Nederlandsche Droogdok Maatschappij (NDM) on 13 February 1879. It was founded by Cornelis and Jan von Lindern, shipbuilders from Alblasserdam. In late 1879, NDM bought a terrain of 4 hectares from the Amsterdam municipality to build a ship repair yard and to moor a floating dry dock. On 17 November 1881, NDM would change its name to Nederlandsche Maatschappij voor Scheepsbouw en Dokken.

== Construction ==
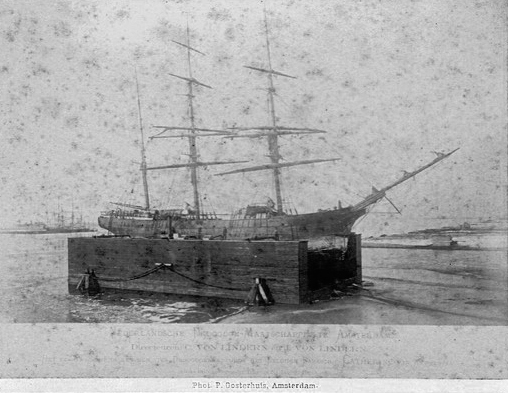
Part of the Von Lindern Drydock in use, c. 1880

The Nederlandsche Droogdok Maatschappij (NDM) would itself build Koningsdok. It was based on a system Cornelis von Lindern saw in Hamburg in 1877. This was a wooden dry dock of several sections that belonged to a Mr. Duncker. While there, Von Lindern heard about a composite dry dock in Kiel. That is, a dock consisting of a steel frame covered with wood.

Cornelis and others travelled over there and spoke to the dock's designer Mr. Georg Howaldt of HowaldtsWerke. It led to Howaldt making a design for a 3,000t composite dock for 6,000 Mark (or selling the design of his existing dock for that price?). Somewhat later, the design was extended for a dock of 3,500t, costing an additional 1,200 Mark. Howaldt came over to Holland to make the molds that were sent to a factory in Duisburg and to the Völklingen Ironworks.

The dry dock was initially known as the Von Lindern Drydock. It got its name Koningsdok only after it was acquired by ADM. The dry dock was built and launched in four sections that could operate independently. On 19 September 1879, the first section was launched. The second section was expected a few months later. The third section of 'well over 40 m', was launched on 30 October 1880. On 4 October 1880, the fourth and last section of the dry dock was launched. The cost of Koningsdok was reported as 380,000 guilders.

== Characteristics ==
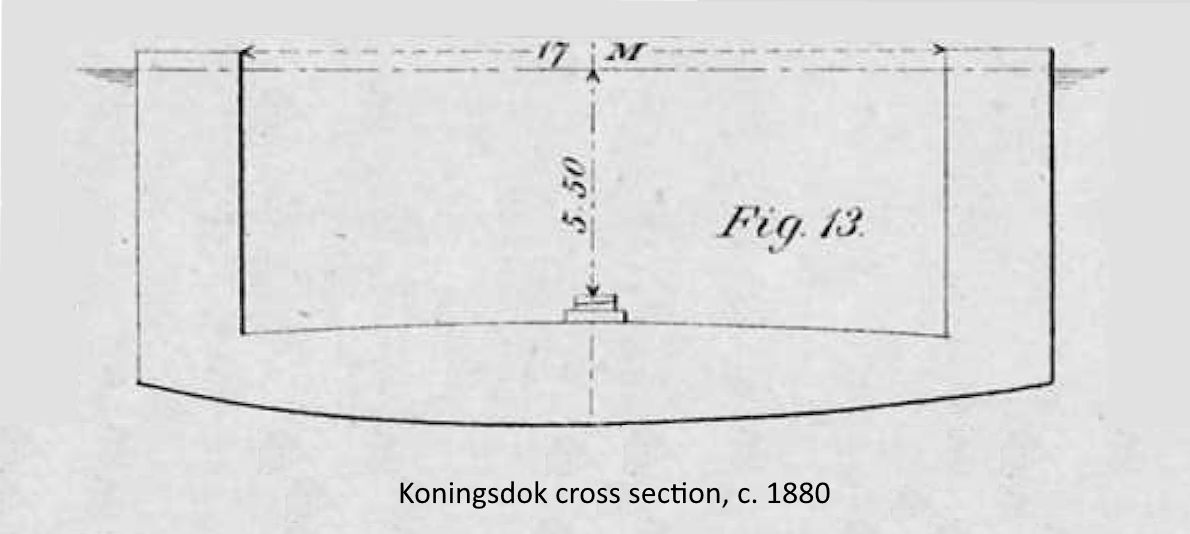
Cross section of Koningsdok

Koningsdok was of composite construction. It consisted of an iron frame with the majority of the exterior covered with timber. The iron had all been made to navy specifications in Germany. The timber was American pitch pine.

The total length of the dry dock was 400 ft 0 in (121.9 m). The first section of Koningsdok was over 40 m long with a beam of 22 m. It could lift 1,200t or ships of 750 GRT with partial load. The first and second section combined would service partially loaded vessels of 1,350 GRT. When all sections were complete, the dry dock would be able to lift a partially loaded vessel of 2,700 GRT. Another report said the total length of Koningsdok would be 123 m and its lift capacity 3.600t. This would be enough to even lift the biggest vessel of the SMN with 900t of added load.

In 1880, while the 'Von Lindern Dock' was still under construction, Tideman gave a description and a cross section. He said it consisted of four parts of 40, 40, 20, and 20 m, which were only connected by chains. The internal width of the dock would be 17 m. The depth of the dock pit would be 9 m, the ditch leading towards it 6.50 m, and therefore the maximum draft for ships visiting the dock would be 5.50 m. The dock would be able to lift 3,500t. Tideman noted that the system required much attention in use, but did well in e.g. Hamburg.

In 1884, Lloyds gave the dimensions of the Koningsdok as overall length at floor 402 ft 0 in (122.5 m); entrance width 56 ft 0 in (17.1 m); depth of sill at ordinary high water 18 ft 0 in (5.5 m) height of sill above bottom of dock 2 ft 6 in (0.8 m). This made Koningsdok an insignificant bit longer than Koninginnedok, but slightly narrower and less deep.

Each part of the dry dock had one or two pumps. The six engines were made by Howaldt. While many floating dry docks could theoretically be used in separate parts, it is often not that clear whether this was actually done. On the contrary, for Koningsdok, there is a statement that its four sections were normally used two by two.

== Owned by NDM ==
Koningsdok was originally known as 'Von Lindern dry dock'. At the time, it was stationed at a location north west of Willem I Lock, where NDM / NMDS had its own repair yard. There actually exists a picture of a part of Koningsdok lifting the Belgian barque Catheriene van Antwerpen, see above.

Not much is known about the first years of the dry dock under NDM / NMSD management. In August 1880, it lifted L. Smit's iron frigate Batavier of 1,616 register ton. For this two parts of the dock, measuring 61 m were used. It made that the 71 m long ship stuck out on both sides.

== Owned by ADM ==
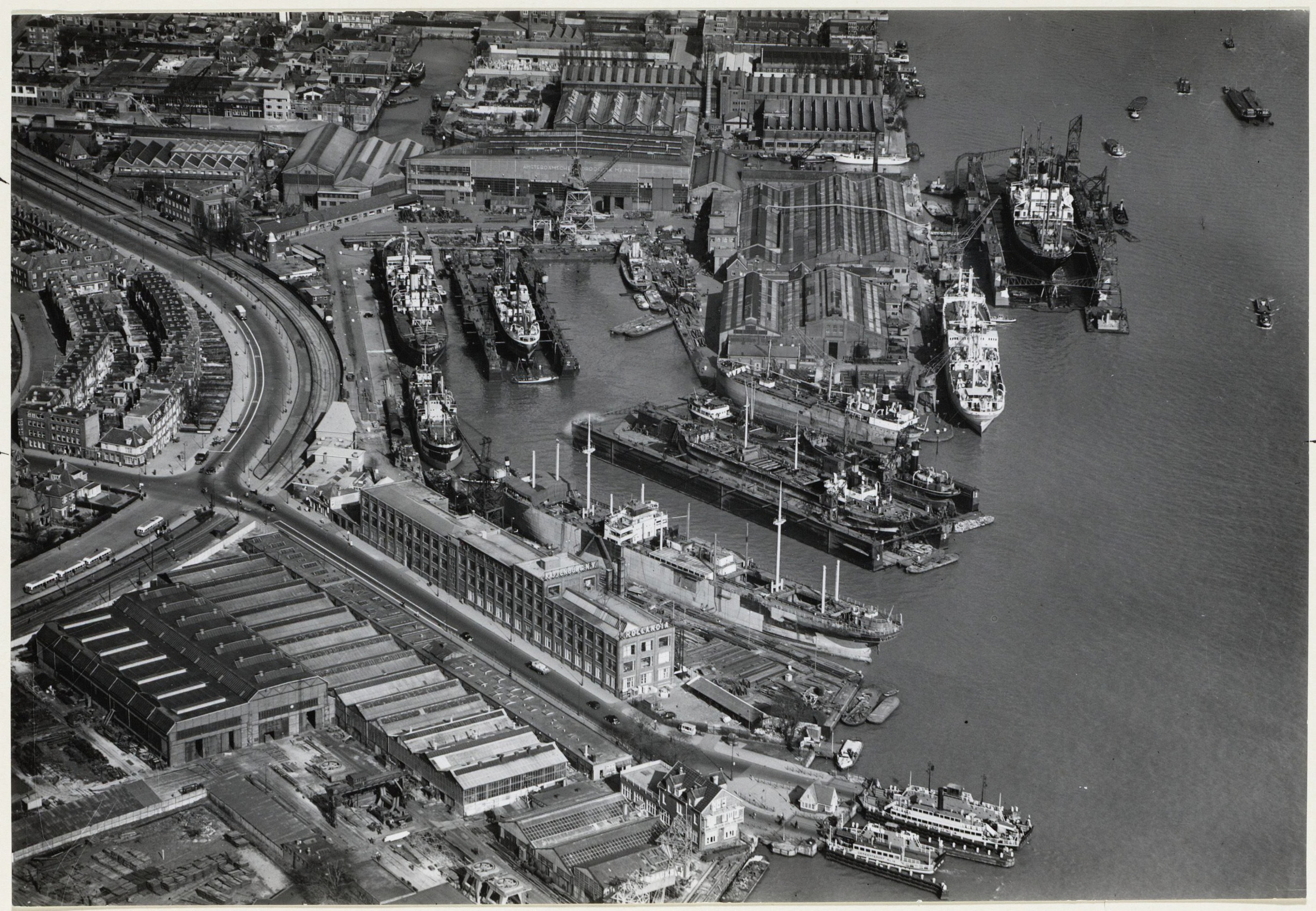
The ADM on 6 April 1950, Koningsdok lifts two vessels

In October 1884, the company that owned Koningsdok was acquired by ADM. ADM then renamed the dock Koningsdok. At some time, it gave it the number '1'. This seemed strange as Koninginnedok was older, larger, and more modern. However, a ship that approached Amsterdam would first meet Koningsdok.

In 1888, SS Prins Frederik, one of the big ships of the SMN, hit the ground near Gibraltar. After provisional repairs, she was towed to Amsterdam. Here, she was lifted by Koningsdok. In mid-October, the final repairs were made on Koninginnedok.

In July 1893, M.S. Springer, wed. Stoepman & Co. bought the steamship Australian (1867) previously owned by the West India & Pacific SS Company. She measured 324 ft 5 in (98.88 m) by 39 ft 8 in (12.09 m) by 26 ft 4 in (8.03 m) and measured 2,499 ton. The ship was pulled to Amsterdam, where it would be broken up, or converted to a four mast sailing ship. While she was moored near Koningsdok, dozens of workers were busy for months breaking her up. On 14 March 1894 Australian then suddenly broke and sank.

The salvage of the wreck was complex. For four weeks, three divers were busy closing all the holes in the hull as well as the break. The break was then sealed with heavy iron sheathing backed up by iron and wooden beams inside the hull. On 27 June, the hull was pumped dry by four centrifugal pumps. The next day, the hull was lifted by Koningsdok. By 8 August 1894, the breaking up of Australian was finished.

ADM would soon built Wilhelmina Drydock, which it moored next to Koninginnedok. In 1903 engineer W. Fenenga gave a description of ADM's three dry docks. He noted that after acquiring Koningsdok, ADM used 'these docks' to lift smaller ships, at which they served very well.

In 1908, ADM wanted to build a fourth dock, Juliana Dock. It wanted to moor this at the place held by Wilhelmina Drydock. ADM therefore proposed to the municipality to exchange the terrain occupied by Koningsdok for a terrain north of Koninginnedok, where it would then build a new harbor for both Koningsdok and Koninginnedok. On 9 February 1909, Koningsdok was moved to its new location. In January 1911, Koninginnedok followed and was moored next to Koningsdok.

On 17 June 1927, lightning hit Koningsdok while a group of workers was taking cover from the weather. At the time, the floating grain elevator Elevator No. 32 of the Graansilo and the vessel Canymedes were on the dock. They had been lifted earlier that day, making that everything was still damp. The lightning probably first hit Canymedes, and then struck below the grain elevator.

The lightning rod of the grain elevator was not connected to the open water and therefore did not function. Fifteen workers taking cover below the elevator were hit and thrown into the mud. Four were killed immediately and seven more were hospitalized. Reports referred to a 'wooden' dry dock No. I, but this of course only applied to its skin. Dock master Mewe would later state that he felt something hitting his hat. Suspecting a stupid joke, he took off his hat and looked around. Just then, he saw his colleagues falling down.

=== Service in Den Oever ===
The Zuiderzee Works that started in 1920, aimed to close the Zuiderzee and reclaim a lot of land. The first major work was the construction of the Afsluitdijk. In order to support this work, the organization that executed it hired a part of Droogdok I from ADM. On 4 October 1928, this left Amsterdam pulled by the tugboat Drente. Over IJmuiden, this reached Den Helder, from whence it was pulled to Den Oever.

The work of Koningsdok was to ease maintenance of the vessels used to construct the Afsluitdijk. On 20 September 1932, this construction was completed. On 22 September 1932, Drente then pulled the dry dock back to IJmuiden.

=== Back in Amsterdam ===
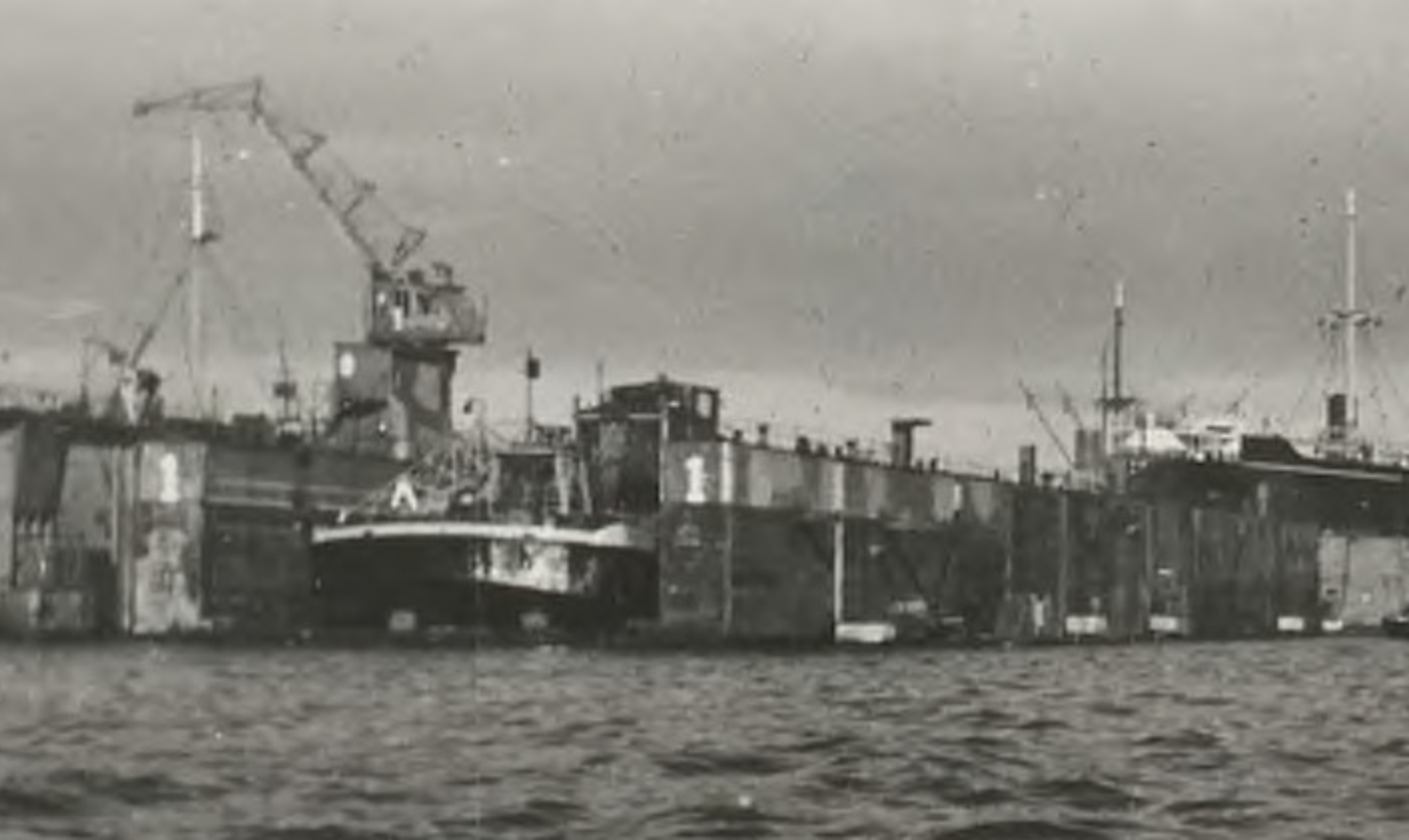
Koningsdok at ADM c. 1945

Koningsdok survived World War II without any damage. In early 1951, a reporter observed Koningsdok from the restored Prins Hendrik Dock. He noted that next year, ADM's 'wooden dock' would become 75 years old. This was obviously not correct, but on 4 September 1952, ADM itself did celebrate its 75th anniversary.

By 1950, Koningsdok had been fully depreciated. Even so, the operating cost of Koningsdok soon became higher than those of modern floating dry docks. This could have several reasons. It might have required more employees, fuel, maintenance, etc. etc. By 1970, this was clearly the case, as ADM said it could hand part of Koningdok to its daughter company Welgelegen Shipyard in Harlingen for its 'scrap value'.

== Split over Amsterdam and Harlingen (1970-c. 1980) ==
In 1970, a part of Koningsdok was sold to shipyard Welgelegen in Harlingen, see below. The other part of Koningsdok continued to be used in Amsterdam. This might have been the part of Koningsdok that was in use in the Westhaven during the 1960s. In 1973, the replenishment ship HNLMS Poolster (A835) was lifted by ADM's 18,000 ton dry dock in the westhaven. A photo of the event shows Koningsdok lifting a much smaller vessel.

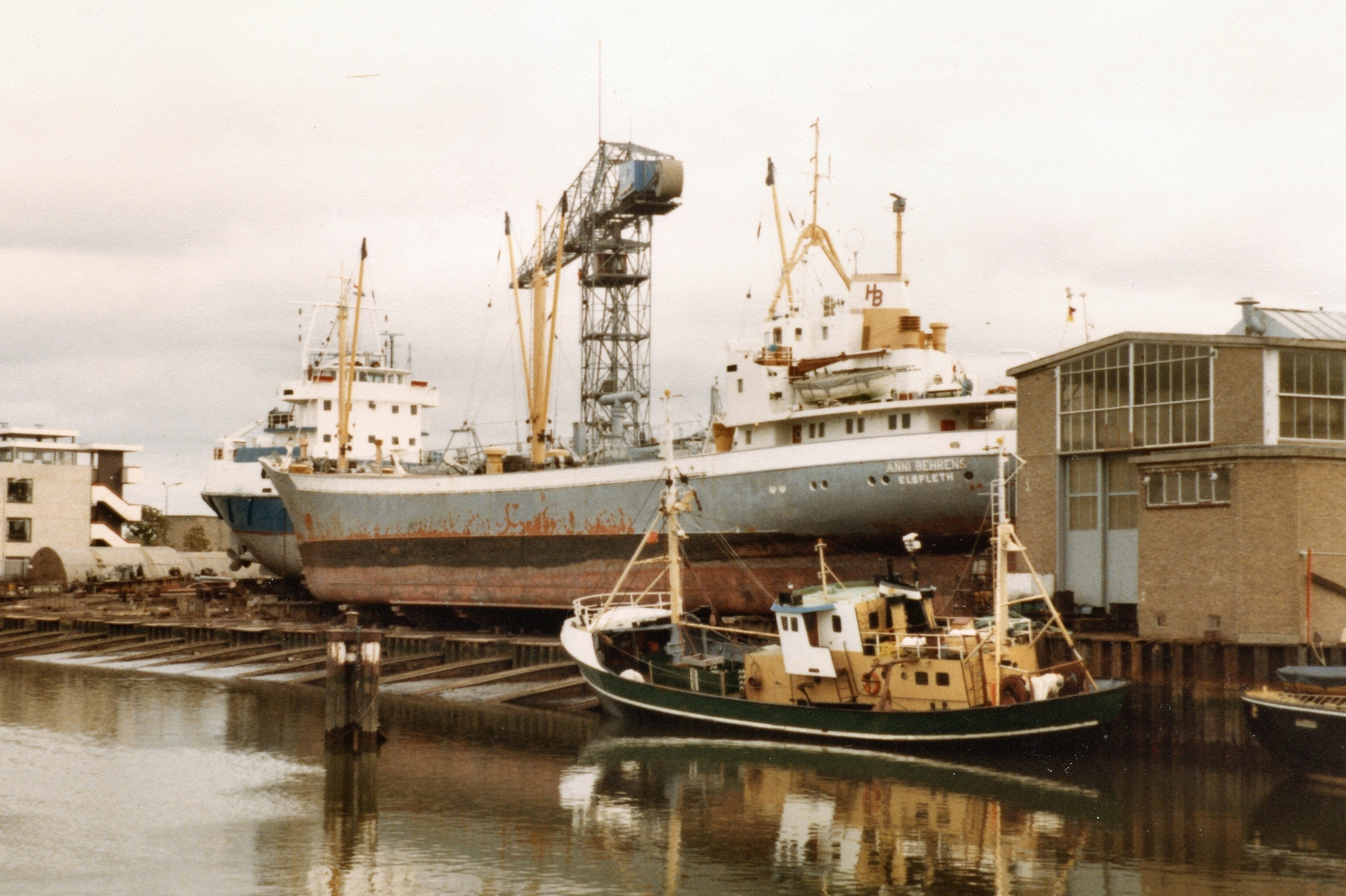
The sideways slipway at Welgelegen in 1981

In May 1969, ADM bought the ten times smaller Shipyard Welgelegen in Harlingen. This was a shipyard that built and repaired small coastal trading vessels and fishing boats. It had a slipway that could pull vessels like the 69,37 m long Anni Behrens of 1,300dwt out of the water (see photo). However, the slipway was not always available as big vessels could not 'pass each other' on it. A less obvious limitation was that the slipway could not serve heavy vessels with a V-shaped hull. Therefore, having a dry dock would make Welgelegen more flexible and able to cover a bigger part of the repair market.

ADM soon planned to move 'one of the two parts of Dock I' to Harlingen. Before ADM moved the 'almost hundred years old' dry dock, it was completely renovated. When it was moved, it was 62.11 m long, had an entrance width of 14.90 m, and a depth on the blocks of 4.72 m. On 28 May 1970, this part of Koningsdok left Amsterdam towed by the tugboat Utrecht. After a trip over the North Sea, the dry dock arrived in Den Helder. On 29 May, three smaller tugboats then pulled it to Harlingen over the Wadden Sea.

The part of Koningsdok that was moved to Harlingen was moored in the Nieuwe Willemshaven. On 25 June 1970, it was officially opened for business. As part of the opening ceremony, it lifted the sea-going tugboat Noord-Holland. A photo of the event shows the dock with two big cranes on top of one of its sides.

== In Harlingen (c. 1980 - 2001) ==
For 1979, Lloyd's had a dry dock of 62 by 17 by 5 m in Harlingen. For 1981, Lloyd's then had one dry dock of 85 by 17 by 5 m, and one dry dock of 45 by 17 by 5 m. Obviously, two docks had been formed out of Koningsdok. One consisted of a big section and two small sections, the other only had a big section. A 1982 movie shows these two docks, one in the Willemshaven and the other in the adjoining Vluchthaven. The pier that separated the two dry docks is the boundary between these two harbours.

In 1983, a third dry dock was moored in the Industriehaven. In 1992, the shipyard managing the dry docks then bought its largest dry dock, Atlas of 178 by 26 m.

It is remarkable that Koningsdok had only scrap value in Amsterdam in 1970, but would continue to serve for 30 years more in Harlingen, see below. One of the reasons was that at ADM, overhead costs were higher.

=== Goliath Drydock and David Drydock ===
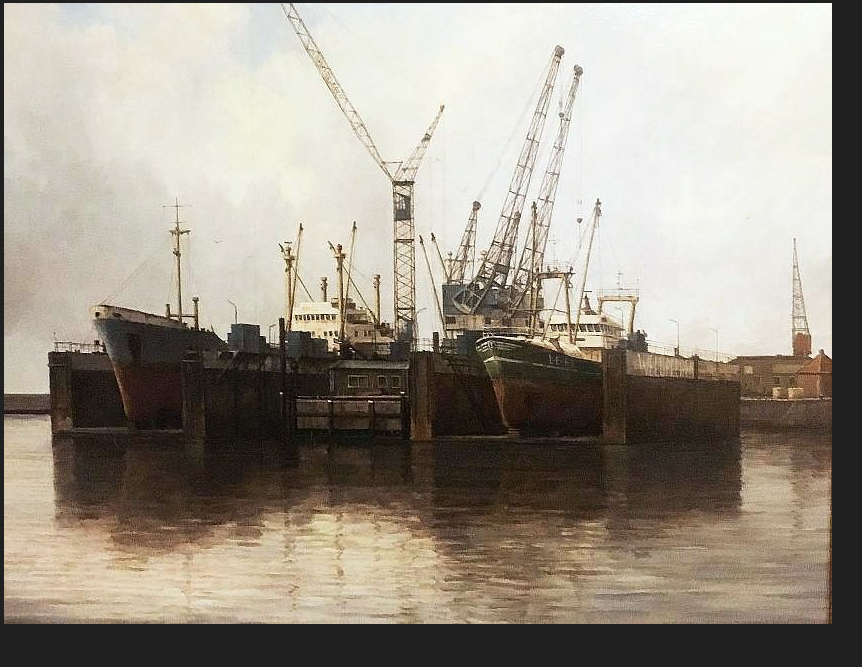
Welgelegen Harlingen

By 1990, Shipyard Welgelegen had named its three floating dry docks: Hercules, Goliath, and David. The 1998 and 1999 Maritime Guide had Hercules as 110 m long, Goliath 85 m, and David 45 m. In 1990 Hercules Drydock was in the Industriehaven. The dry docks Goliath and David, were in the Willemshaven and the Vluchthaven. At the time, the smaller docks were to be moved to a position alongside Hercules.

A photo shows that the part of Koningsdok that arrived in 1970 was indeed first moored in the Industriehaven, west of the pier. A painting by Peter J Sterkenburg (1955–2000) depicts two occupied dry docks in the Willemshaven / Vluchthaven of Harlingen. The photograph that Sterkenburg used to make the painting shows two very similar dry docks with the eastern dock (David) lifting LE-63 Soli Deo Gloria, and the western dock (Goliath) being empty. LE-63 now PZ-1053, was built in 1974, and is a vessel of 33 by 7.5 by 3.5 m. The cranes on the side of David Drydock were those that were on the part of Koningsdok that arrived in 1970.

On 20 February 1999, Goliath Drydock broke while the fishing ship Barracuda of 1,500t from Kingstown was on it. The dock then partially sunk, but Barracuda was able to leave. Goliath Drydock was said to be 85 m by 16 m and able to lift 1,750t. On 6 March, the 'hundred years old' dock was pumped dry, but sank again. On Monday 8 March 1999 a second attempt also failed. Two of the seven compartments were found to be leaking. The second attempt increased the dent in the bottom. It was then planned to put the short part of 35 m on Atlas Drydock. One hoped to surface the longer part of 50 m later. On 18 March 1999, a new attempt was made to dissect the 85 m long dock. That day the 35 m long part would be cut in three to remove it. On 23 March the rest of the dock was put on Atlas Drydock.

In November 2001, the small David Drydock was put on one of the other dry docks and was broken up. In mid December 2001, this was said to have been almost done.

Hercules Drydock soon followed. It would be 'narrowed' by 6 m to make it fit onto Atlas. In 2002, it became known that Atlas Drydock would be broken up. In September 2002, the breaking up of Atlas started.
