= MS Moldanger (1932) =

Norwegian cargo ship

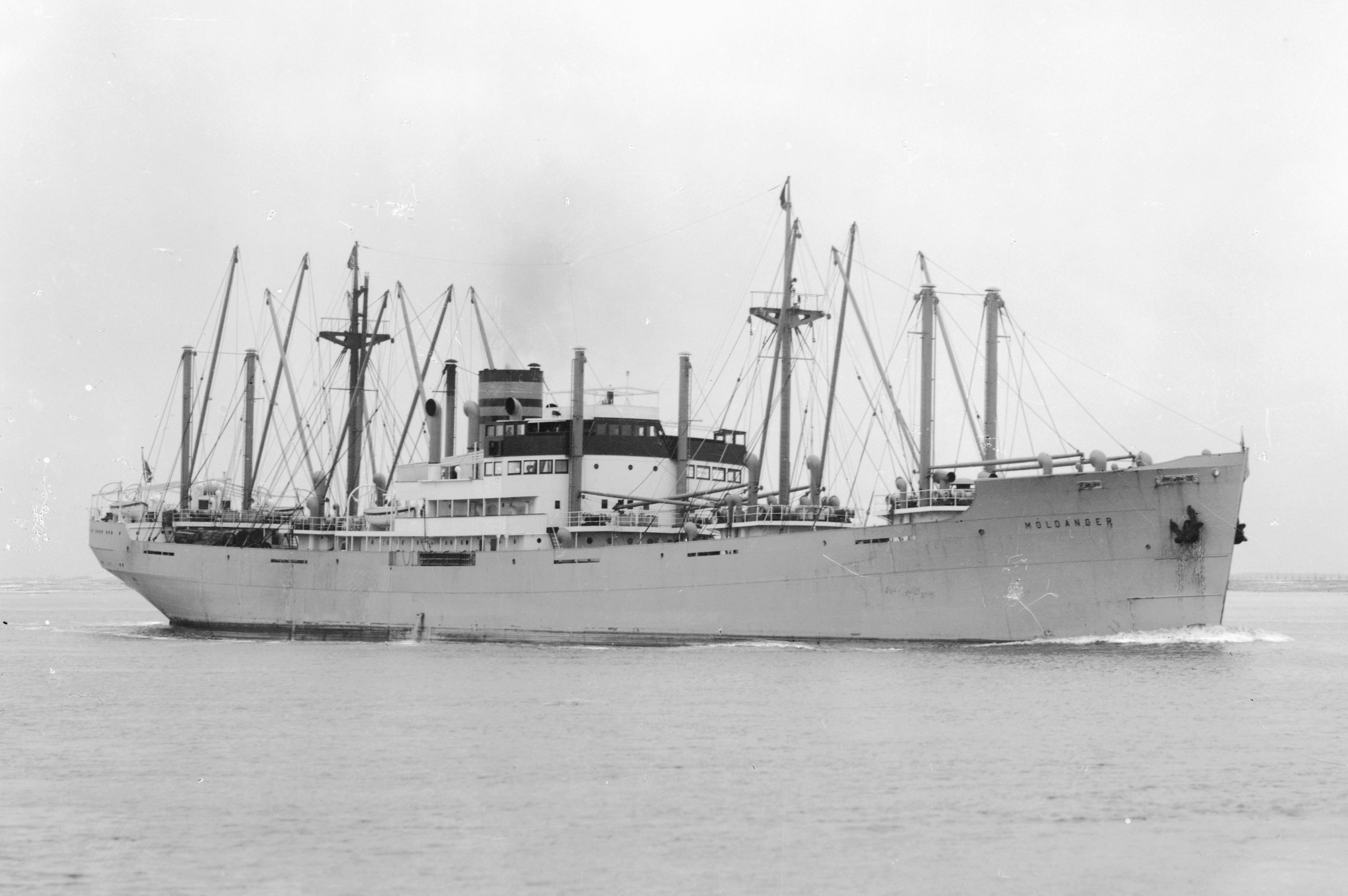
- Moldanger on the river Scheldt

History

Norway
- Name: Moldanger
- Builder: Nederlandsche Scheepsbouw Maatschappij
- Yard number: 216
- Laid down: 22 August 1931
- Launched: 4 June 1932
- Fate: sunk 27 June 1942

General characteristics
- Type: refrigerated cargo ship
- Displacement: 14,900 tons
- Length: 486 ft 0 in (148.13 m)
- Beam: 61 ft 0 in (18.59 m)
- Draught: 26 ft 10 in (8.18 m)
- Depth of hold: 39 ft 6 in (12.04 m)
- Installed power: 16,000 ihp (12,000 kW)
- Propulsion: Single screw
- Speed: 16 knots (30 km/h) (avg.)
- Complement: 44 (WW II)
- Armament: WW II: 1 * 4 in (10.16 cm) gun (stern); 2 * 0.303 in (0.77 cm) mg (bridge)

MS Moldanger was a Norwegian refrigerated cargo ship belonging to the Bergen shipping company Westfal-Larsen.

Moldanger suffered from a severe fire during construction. This made that she sunk and required extensive repairs. After she was refloated, she was transported back to her builder on board a floating dry dock.

In 1942, Moldanger sank after being torpedoed off the east coast of the United States. One of the ship's rescue craft, a raft with nine men on board, drifted at sea for 42 days before the shipwrecked were rescued. This was the longest raft voyage with shipwrecked people from any Norwegian ship.

== General characteristics and construction ==
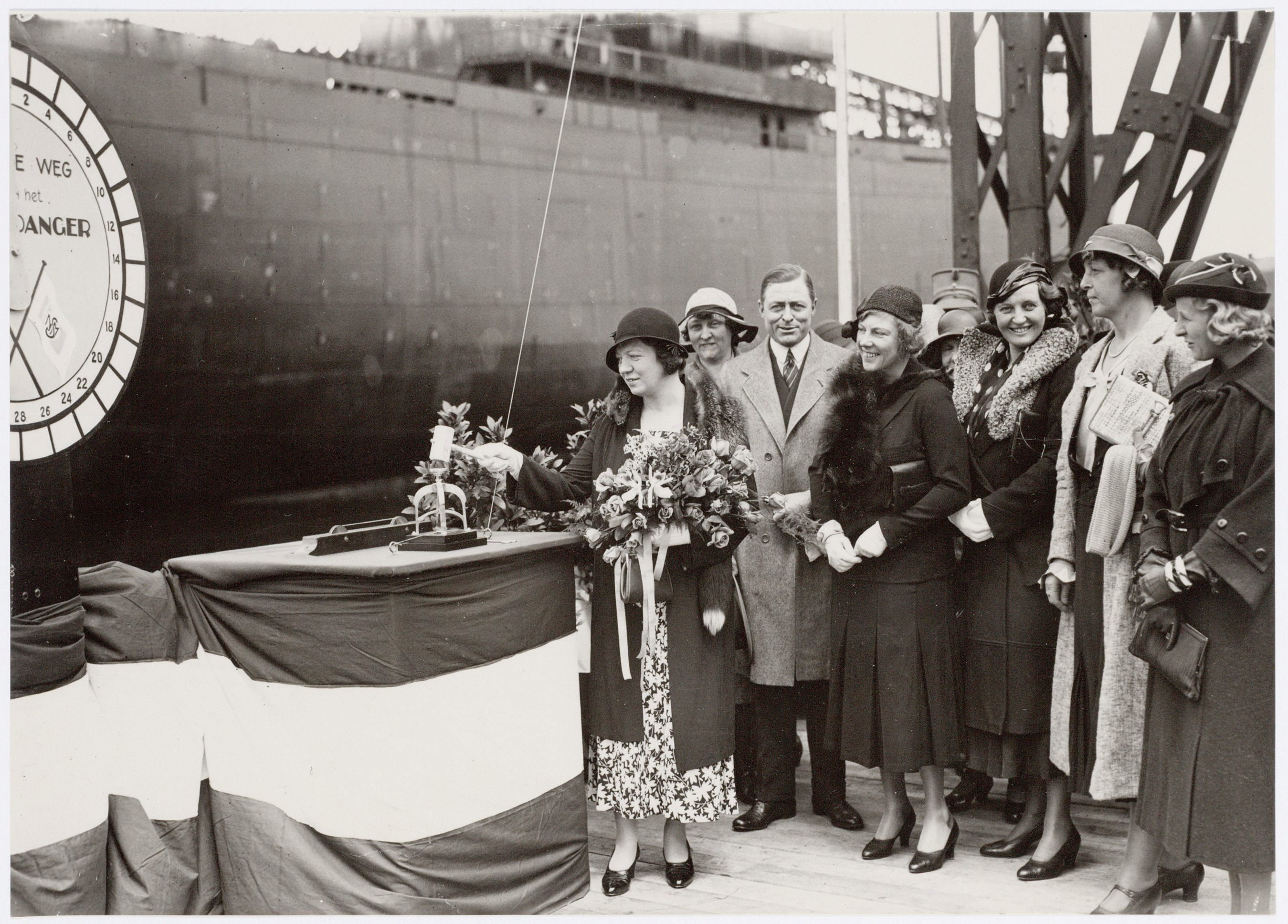
Launch by Mrs. Utermohlen-Engelsen

Moldanger and her sisters Trondanger and Berganger were three reefer ships meant to sail between the west-coast of the North America and North West Europe. Ports in North America would be Vancouver, Seattle, Portland, San Francisco, and Los Angeles. Ports in Europe would be in France, Belgium, and the Netherlands. The carrying capacity of the ships was 9,400 ton. The average speed would be 16 knots, so the trip from California to Europe would take no more than 20 days.

The plan for Moldanger and her sisters called for three single screw motorships for passengers and cargo with a capacity of 9,500 ton. Displacement was 14,900 ton. Dimensions would be 485 by 61.3 by 39.6 feet. The ships would have large refrigerated cargo holds to transport frozen fruits, flesh, and fish. The propulsion would be done by two Stork AEG Hesselman engines of the double acting two tact type with a power of 8,000 ihp each. The auxiliary engines of 1,400 ihp would also be built by Stork. To limit the amount of power required to refrigerate the cargo, a lot of insulation material was applied around the cargo hold. At the time, this was made of cork, wood, and paper. More details of the ship were published when Berganger and Moldanger was launched.

In May 1931, the order for Moldanger and her sisters was awarded to the Nederlandsche Scheepsbouw Maatschappij. The first two ships were laid down in early August and on 22 August 1931. The first ship, Berganger was launched on 30 April 1932. Moldanger was launched on 4 June 1932. Trondanger followed on 2 July 1932. After her launch on 4 June, the completion and handover of Moldanger was planned for 15 September 1932.

=== Disastrous fire ===
Moldanger on fire at NSM

While she was still being completed, a fire broke out on board Moldanger on 15 July 1932. At a quarter to six in the morning, a guard discovered the fire in hold III. He notified the doorman, who in turn notified the fire brigade. Soon the alarm increased and firefighters and equipment were shipped across the IJ to help. At about half past six the firefighters were working in full force, but even by ten o'clock they could not get the fire under control.

At 6:45 AM, Berganger, which was moored next to Moldanger, was towed to safety. The fireboat Jason was positioned on the port side of Moldanger. Fireboat Jan van der Heyde was on starboard. The water cannon of these fireboats were usually very effective, but they could not get a grip on this fire.

At 9:30 AM, Moldanger began to list 17 degrees to port. At about the same time the fire reached holds I and II. Unfortunately, the latter contained 500 balen of cork. At about 11:45 AM, the list of the ship was so bad that all kinds of equipment that had not been fixed yet began to shove. The firefighters then had to evacuate the vessel. Both fireboats then worked from starboard. Here six holes were drilled in the hull so firewater could better reach the fire.

The fire on board Moldanger was only extinguished in the late evening of the 18th, 60 hours after it started. An enormous amount of water was put into the ship to accomplish this. The firewater then had to be pumped out. This was difficult because of all the cork and wood debris clogging the pumps.

On 21 July, Moldanger was almost dry, when she suddenly sat upright again. This made that one of the holes in her side got below the water. Moldanger then sank in 7 m of water.

=== Refloated and repaired ===
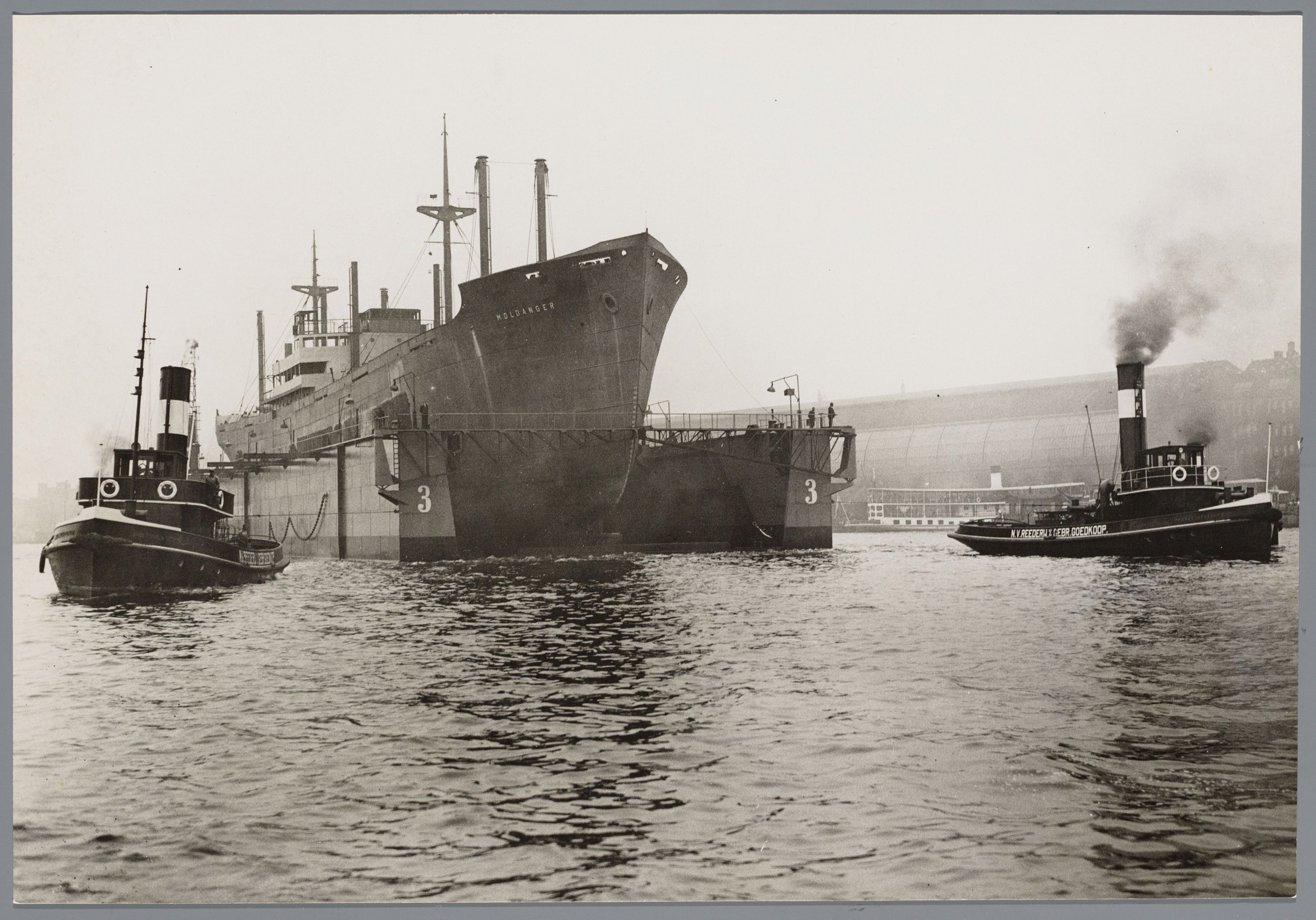
Moved by Wilhelmina Drydock on 16 august 1932

Moved by Wilhelminadok

After Moldanger had sunk, A diver had to close the holes in the hull. After that was done, the operation to refloat Moldanger was simple. From her draft of 26 ft 10 in (8.18 m), one can deduct that in 7 m of water, her sides were above the water. It was a matter of pumping out 15,000t of water. By 26 July, there was only 3,000t to go and Moldanger was already afloat.

Moldanger was then was pulled to the repair shipyard Amsterdamsche Droogdok Maatschappij (ADM). Here, she was lifted by Juliana Drydock on 29 July. Of course, NSM employees could repair and complete the ship at the ADM site, but it was cheaper to do this at the NSM shipyard. By 14 August, the engines and auxiliary engines had been removed from Moldanger for repairs. Moldanger was then lifted again, this time by Wilhelmina Drydock.

The next step was a spectacular and rare event. Wilhelmina Drydock would be pulled to the NSM shipyard while Moldanger was on top of her. The Amsterdam port authortities therefore made a boat available for the press to report about it. On 16 August, the chains that held Wilhelminadok in place were cut. Four tugboats of the Gebroeders Goedkoop attached to the dry dock. Anna Cornelia and Pieter pulled in front. Elizabeth and Henriëtte Goedkoop were attached to the stern in reverse, so they could correct the course. The combination was then pulled to NSM. During the repairs, Moldanger had to remain on the dry dock, because the repairs included taking out a part of the ship to replace it.

On 6 December 1932, Wilhelminadok and Moldanger were pulled back to ADM. Wilhelminadok was first pulled westward to the Houthaven, where she was turned about. She was then pulled to ADM, where she turned again before she was carefully moved between the dolphins that kept her in place. That same day, at three o'clock, Moldanger was floated out of Wilhelminadok. The ship was then pulled back to NSM, where she arrived at 6.

On 13 March 1933, Moldanger left Amsterdam. On 14 March she ran her trials on the North Sea. After the trials, where she reached 18 knots, she was handed over to Westfal-Larsen. About 50 guests were present. Moldanger then returned to IJmuiden.

== Service ==
=== Between the Pacific and Europe ===
On 15 March 1933, Moldanger left IJmuiden for Vancouver. On 29 March, she reached Colón, Panama, from whence she left on 30 March. On 6 April, she arrived in Los Angeles. On 11 April she arrived in Vancouver. On 16 April, she left Seattle. On 17 April she arrived in Portland, from whence she left on 20 April. On 23 April, she left San Francisco. On 25 April, she left Los Angeles. On 4 May Moldanger arrived in Panama. By then, she was expected to arrive in Rotterdam on 25 May. On 4 May, she left Colón. On 18 May, Moldanger arrived in Liverpool. On 22 May, she arrived in London. On 24 May, she arrived back in Rotterdam.

At the end of her first return voyage, Moldanger unloaded : 325 crates of conserved salmon; 200 crates of dried apricots; 100 crates of conserved sardinops; two crates of auto parts; 146 bd. of plywood; 50 bags of dried plums, 45 bags of kaolinite; 1,100 bags of borax; and 7,269,600 lb of wheat. Of course, Moldanger had also unloaded cargo in England.

The three ships successfully increased the business of Westfal's Interocean Line, shipping fresh fruit from California to Le Havre and other European ports. In the 1930s, Moldanger continued to ply between the Vancouver and Rotterdam. The intermediate harbors did change. On 5 January 1940, Moldanger arrived in Amsterdam with an important cargo of Californian dried fruits.

=== World War II ===
As of March 1940, Moldanger was used in transports between the South American Atlantic ports and US east cost ports. In 1941, she included South American ports in the Caribbean and North American Pacific ports. During the war, Moldanger was managed by Nortraship, which managed the Norwegian ships that were not captured.

On 4 April 1942, Moldanger left Vancouver. After stops in New Westminster, Seattle, and San Francisco, she arrived in Valparaíso. On 5 May, she sailed from there for Buenos Aires, arriving there on the 16th. On 8 June, she left Buenos Aires for New York. The captain of "M/S Moldanger" on this trip was Frode Bjørn Hansen.

== Torpedo attack ==
On 27 June 1942 at 16:30, Moldanger was torpedoed by the German submarine U-404. Of the crew of 44, two were killed instantly by the first torpedo. A further 11 crew were killed by the second torpedo, as the crew was in the process of lowering the lifeboats.

The 31 survivors were divided over 3 vessels: 16 in a motor lifeboat, 6 in a gig and 9 on two rafts. For the first few days, the shipwrecked held all the vessels together with ropes. Eventually they decided that the more maneuverable boats should try to reach the US coast – about 200 nautical miles away – and from there call for help to salvage the rafts that were most adrift. Those of the crew who were in the best shape remained on the rafts, which remained tied together.

The motor lifeboat was rescued by the Canadian corvette HMCS Buctouche on 7 July 1942. One of the men aboard this lifeboat had been wounded. By the time Buctouche came to the rescue, this man had already died from his injuries and been buried at sea.

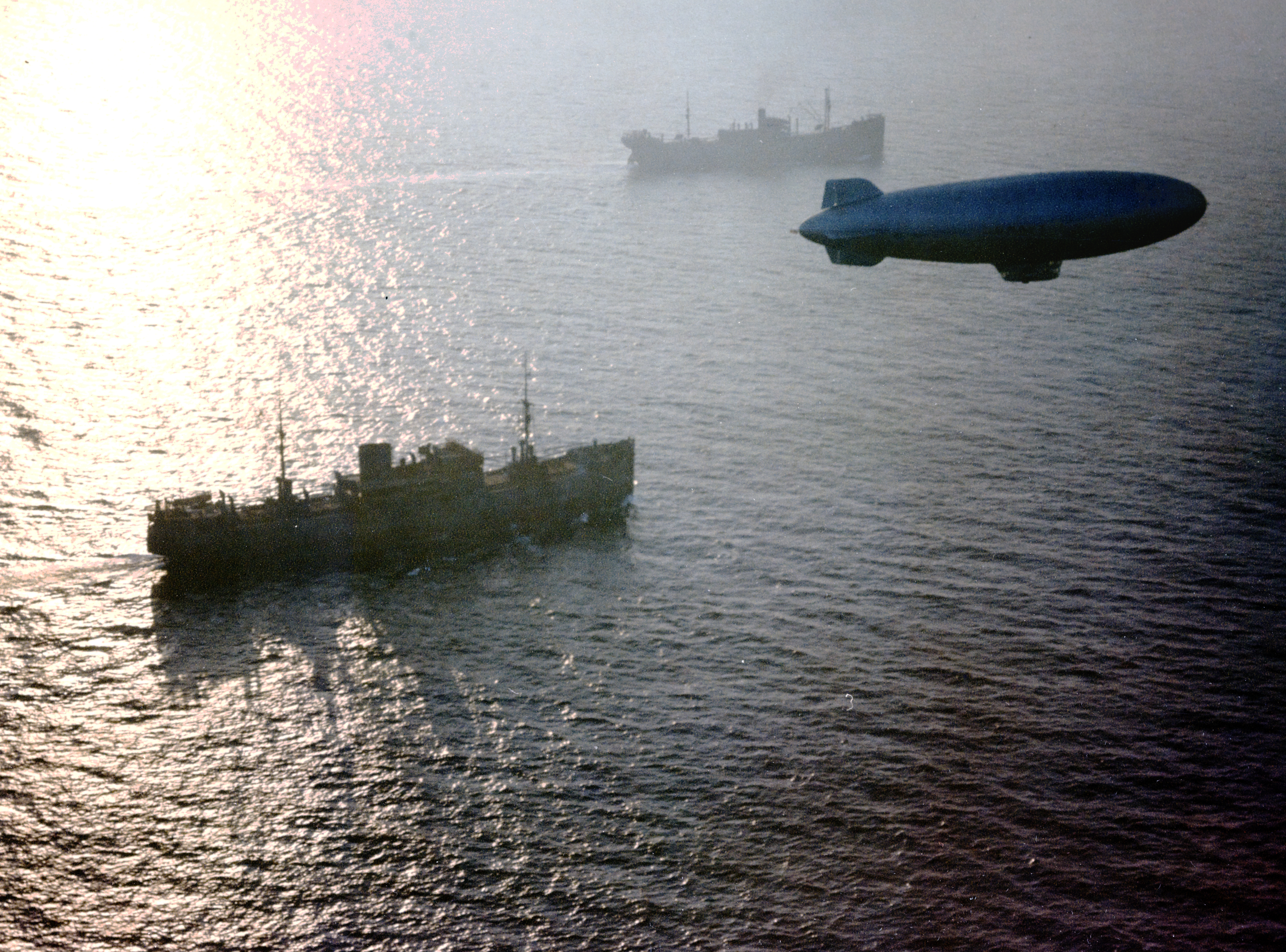
A K-class blimp c. 1943/44

On 15 July an army aircraft observed the gig. Soon the K-9, a K-class blimp (a non-rigid airship) arrived. The K-9 dropped water and food for the sailors and remained above them till the sailors were rescued by the US Navy patrol boat USS PC-495 at 6 PM.

The two rafts were not so lucky. They were found by the Norwegian ship Washington Express on 14 August 1942. Washington Express steamed alone because it was a fast vessel and was on its way to New York with fruit. The Norwegian journalist Åke Fen was on board the Washington Express. He had fled Norway after serving time at Møllergata 19 and in the Grini prison camp. He was on his way from London to New York to serve at the Norwegian press office there. The week after arriving in New York, Fen participated in the radio program The Spirit of the Vikings. Here he interviewed one of the men from the raft about the incident. The name of the interviewee was not revealed in the program so as not to expose the man's family back home in Norway to reprisals from the German occupation forces. It was later learned that his name was Kåre Kårstad. However, all nine were pictured on the cover of The New York Times.

The men on the raft had largely survived on collected rainwater and by eating fish and turtles. Fishing and trapping were done with improvised tools.

== Aftermath ==
The story of the survivors on the rafts sparked a lot of interest. By chance, the Washington Express had two physicians on board Gjestland and Lee. They examined the survivors, and published an article about their findings.

As a consequences of the fate of the rafts, the regulations for rafts on Norwegian ships were changed with a view to longer periods at sea. The water supply per raft was increased from 2.6 to 6.5 gallons; a piece of canvas was added to collect rainwater; another canvas was added to protect against sun and or sea; fishing equipment was added; Pemmican, chocolate and tinned meat were added to the stores; cutting tools and can openers were added; a flashlight and signaling whistle were added.
