= HMCS Buctouche =

Flower-class corvette

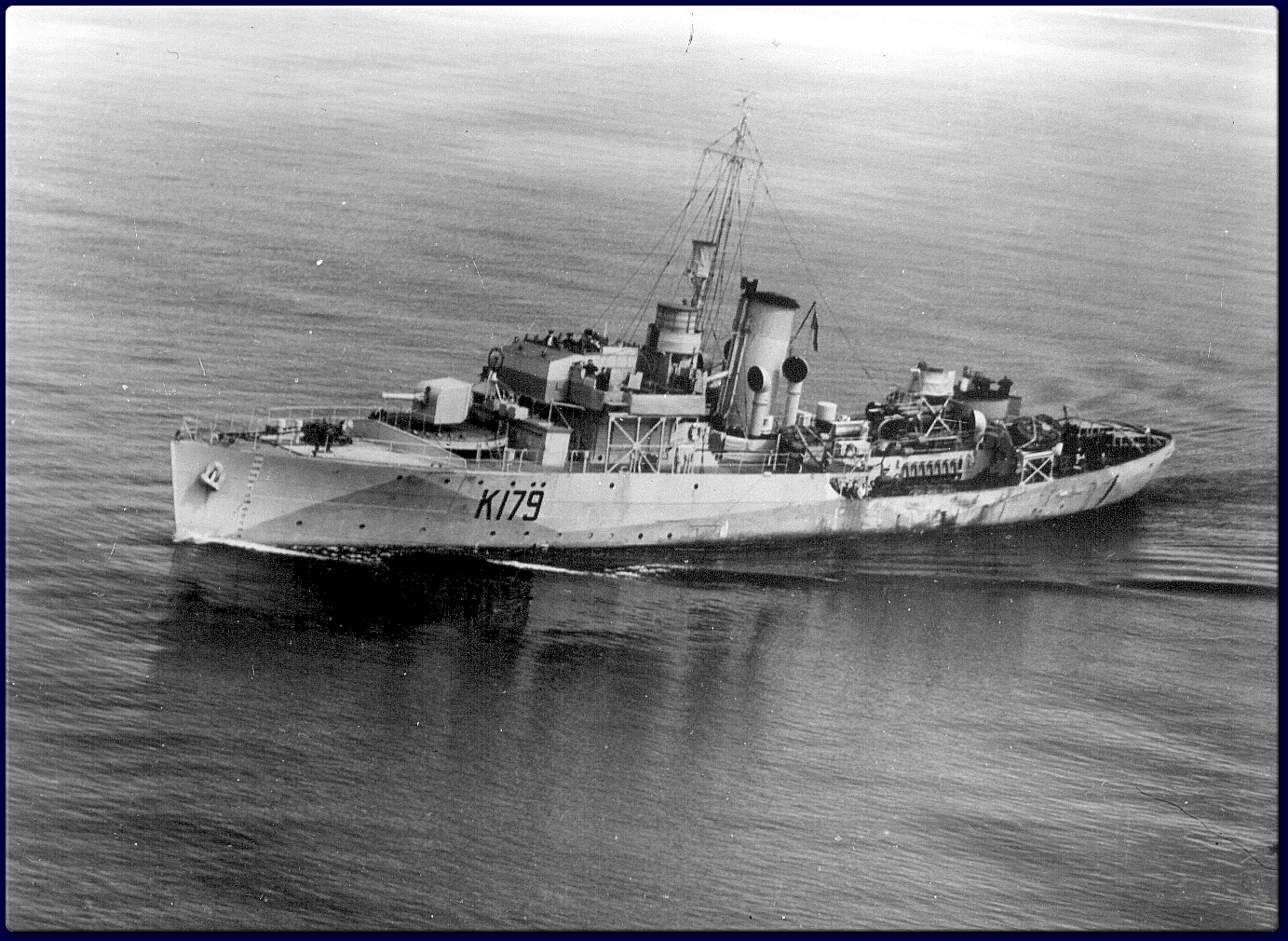
- HMCS Buctouche, c. 1944–1945

History

Canada
- Name: Buctouche
- Namesake: Bouctouche, New Brunswick
- Ordered: 22 January 1940
- Builder: Davie Shipbuilding, Lauzon
- Laid down: 14 August 1940
- Launched: 20 November 1940
- Commissioned: 5 June 1941
- Decommissioned: 15 June 1945
- Identification: Pennant number: K179
- Honours and awards: Atlantic 1941–45
- Fate: Scrapped in 1949

General characteristics
- Class & type: Flower-class corvette (original)
- Displacement: 925 long tons (940 t)
- Length: 205 ft (62.48 m)o/a
- Beam: 33 ft (10.06 m)
- Draught: 11.5 ft (3.51 m)
- Propulsion: 1 × shaft; 2 × firetube Scotch boilers; 1 × 4-cylinder triple-expansion reciprocating steam engine; 2,750 ihp (2,050 kW)
- Speed: 16 knots (30 km/h; 18 mph)
- Range: 3,500 nmi (6,500 km; 4,000 mi) at 12 knots (22 km/h; 14 mph)
- Complement: 85
- Sensors & processing systems: 1 × SW1 Cor 2C radar; 1 × Type 123A or Type 127DV sonar
- Armament: 1 × single BL 4 in (102 mm) Mk.IX gun; 2 × twin .50 cal machine guns; 2 × twin Lewis .303 cal machine guns; 2 × Mk.II depth charge throwers; 2 × depth charge rails with 40 depth charges; originally fitted with minesweeping gear, later removed

HMCS Buctouche was a Flower-class corvette that served in the Royal Canadian Navy (RCN) during the Second World War. She served primarily in the Battle of the Atlantic escorting merchant ship convoys. Constructed by Davie Shipbuilding at Lauzon, Quebec, the vessel was laid down 14 August 1940 and was launched on 20 November that year. The corvette was named for Bouctouche, New Brunswick and was commissioned on 5 June 1941. Buctouche successfully damaged a U-boat during an engagement off the Avalon Peninsula. In 1944, the vessel went aground at Hamilton Inlet, Labrador. Following the war, the ship was decommissioned on 23 October 1945 and was sold for scrap in 1949.

== Design and description ==
Flower-class corvettes such as Buctouche serving with the Royal Canadian Navy (RCN) in the Second World War were different from earlier and more traditional sail-driven corvettes. The Flower-class corvettes originated from a need that arose in 1938 to expand the Royal Navy following the Munich Crisis. A design request went out for a small escort for coastal convoys. Based on a traditional whaler-type design, the initial Canadian ships of the Flower class had a standard displacement of 950 long tons (970 t). They were 205 feet 1 inch (62.51 m) long overall with a beam of 33 feet 1 inch (10.08 m) and a maximum draught of 13 feet 5 inches (4.09 m). The initial 1939–1940 corvettes were powered by a four-cylinder vertical triple expansion engine powered by steam from two Scotch boilers turning one three-bladed propeller rated at 2,800 indicated horsepower (2,100 kW). The Scotch boilers were replaced with water-tube boilers in later 1939–1940 and 1940–1941 Programme ships. The corvettes had a maximum speed of 16 knots (30 km/h; 18 mph). This gave them a range of 3,450 nautical miles (6,390 km; 3,970 mi) at 12 knots (22 km/h; 14 mph). The vessels were extremely wet.

The Canadian Flower-class vessels were initially armed with a Mk IX BL 4-inch (102 mm) gun forward on a CP 1 mounting and carried 100 rounds per gun. The corvettes were also armed with a QF Vickers 2-pounder (40 mm, 1.6 in) gun on a bandstand aft, two single-mounted .303 Vickers machine guns or Browning 0.5-calibre machine guns for anti-aircraft defence and two twin-mounted .303 Lewis machine guns, usually sited on bridge wings. For anti-submarine warfare, they mounted two depth charge throwers and initially carried 25 depth charges. The corvettes were designed with a Type 123 ASDIC sonar set installed. The Flower-class ships had a complement of 47 officers and ratings. The Royal Canadian Navy initially ordered 54 corvettes in 1940 and these were fitted with Mark II Oropesa minesweeping gear used for destroying contact mines. Part of the depth charge rails were made portable so the minesweeping gear could be utilised.

=== Modifications ===
In Canadian service the vessels were altered due to experience with the design's deficiencies. The galley was moved further back in the ship and the mess and sleeping quarters combined. A wireless direction finding set was installed, and enlarged bilge keels were installed to reduce rolling. After the first 35–40 corvettes had been constructed, the foremast was shifted aft of the bridge and the mainmast was eliminated. Corvettes were first fitted with basic SW-1 and SW-2 CQ surface warning radar, notable for their fishbone-like antenna and reputation for failure in poor weather or in the dark. The compass house was moved further aft and the open-type bridge was situated in front of it. The ASDIC hut was moved in front and to a lower position on the bridge. The improved Type 271 radar was placed aft, with some units receiving Type 291 radar for air search. The minesweeping gear, a feature of the first 54 corvettes, was removed. Most Canadian Flower-class corvettes had their forecastles extended which improved crew accommodation and seakeeping. Furthermore, the sheer and flare of the bow was increased, which led to an enlarged bridge. This allowed for the installation of Oerlikon 20 mm (0.8 in) cannon, replacing the Browning and Vickers machine guns. Some of the corvettes were rearmed with Hedgehog anti-submarine mortars. The complements of the ships grew throughout the war rising from the initial 47 to as many as 104.

== Construction and career ==
The corvette was ordered as part of the 1939–1940 Flower-class building programme. The vessel was laid down by Davie Shipbuilding & Repairing Co. Ltd. at their yard in Lauzon, Quebec on 14 August 1940 and was launched on 20 November that year. Buctouche, named for the community in New Brunswick, was commissioned into the RCN on 5 June 1941 at Quebec City.

After working up, Buctouche joined the Newfoundland Escort Force in July 1941. She escorted merchant ship convoys through the Battle of the Atlantic from St. John's to Iceland beginning August 1941 with Escort Group (EG) 21. On her first convoy mission with convoy SC 41, the group was rerouted around a German U-boat wolfpack. The following escort mission for the convoy ONS 36 went untroubled. However, SC 52, which departed Sydney, Nova Scotia on 29 October, which was escorted by Buctouche's escort group had to change course due to U-boat wolfpacks before they had left North American coastal waters. The convoy was discovered by the wolfpacks on 1 November and the first defence of the convoy began that night by the Free French corvette Aconit. The first merchant ship victims were sunk on 2 November. The number of attacks on the convoy before it had got to open sea forced the British Admiralty to turn the convoy back on 3 November, the only convoy to be forced to return to base in the entire war. Two more merchants were sunk and Buctouche and HMS Nasturtium recovered the crews of Empire Gemsbuck and Everoja. With the strength of the attacks worsening, the convoy commander ordered it to scatter and the battle ended with seven merchant ships lost and no U-boats. Buctouche's following convoy assignments, SC 58, ONS 48, SC 64, and ONS 60 went undisturbed by German attacks.

In June 1942 Buctouche transferred to the Western Local Escort Force (WLEF) escorting convoys mainly in North American waters. On 7 July 1942 she found the motor launch with part of the survivors of MS Moldanger. Moldanger had been sunk by U-404 on 27 June 1942. In June 1943, new escort groups were formed and Buctouche was assigned to EG W-1. On 21 November 1943, Buctouche, now a part of EG W-2, was escorting the outbound convoy ON 145 off the Avalon Peninsula when it came under attack by U-boats. Three vessels were hit, but only one, Empire Sailor, sank. Buctouche attacked U-518 after the submarine had been spotted by the merchant ships. The corvette's attack seriously damaged the U-boat and forced U-518 to break off and return to base. Buctouche underwent a refit at the end of 1943 that was completed on 29 January 1944 that extended the ship's forecastle. In mid-1944 Buctouche was assigned to Quebec Force for two month. On 28 June 1944, the corvette went aground at Hamilton Inlet, Labrador, but was freed and sailed for Pictou, Nova Scotia where the vessel spent the next two months under repair. Buctouche was paid off on 23 October 1945 at Sorel, Quebec. The corvette was sold for scrap and broken up in 1949 at Hamilton. For service during the Second World War, the ship was given the battle honour "Atlantic 1939–45".
