= Wilhelmina Drydock (1899) =

Former floating dry dock in Amsterdam, Netherlands

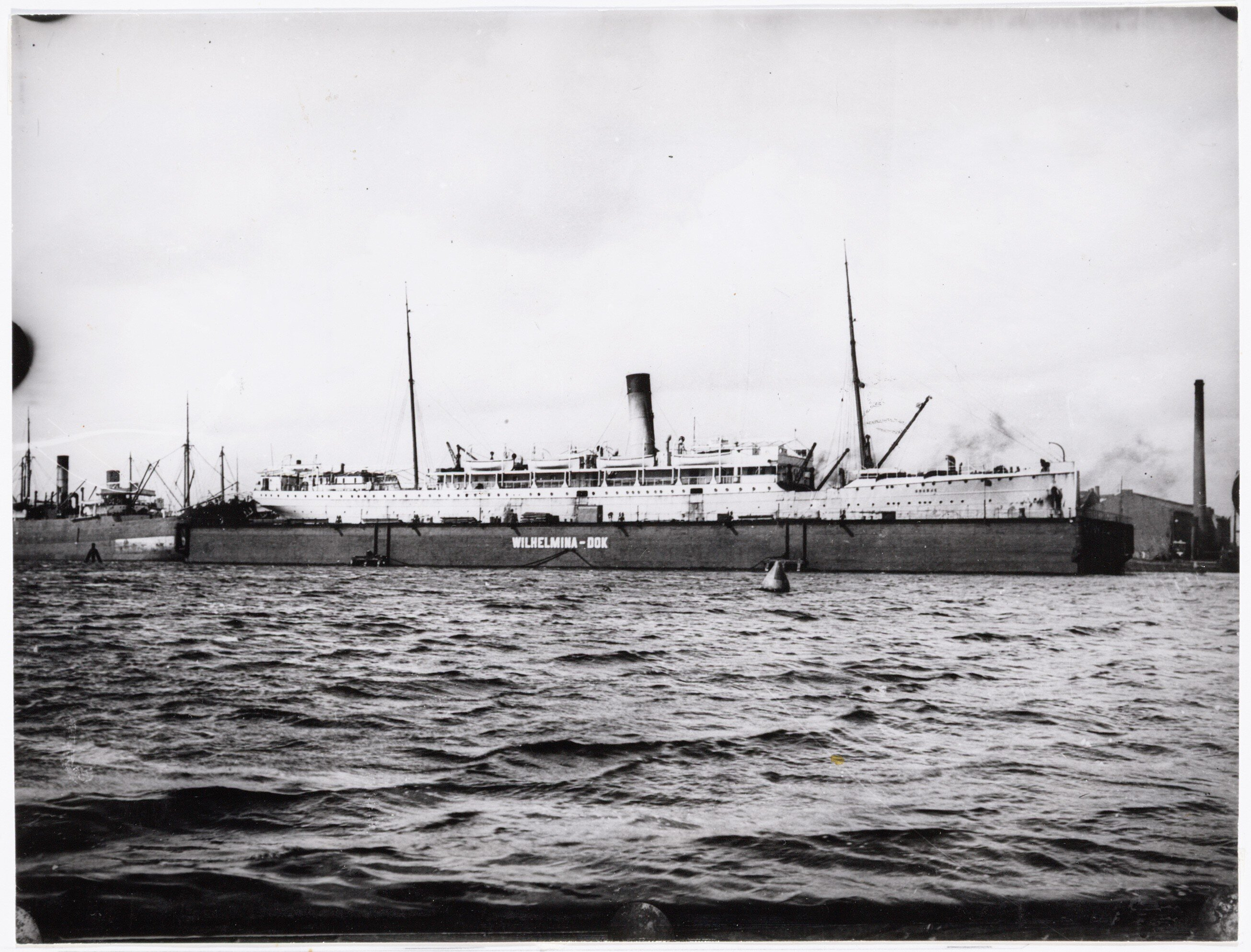
- Wilhelmina Drydock in c. 1911. On top is the ocean liner SS Oranje

History

Netherlands
- Name: Wilhelmina Drydock
- Builder: Nederlandsche Scheepsbouw Maatschappij (NSM)
- Launched: 24 September 1898
- Christened: 14 May 1899
- Home port: Amsterdam

General characteristics (as completed)
- Length: 424 ft 4 in (129.34 m) (1899); 151 m (495.41 ft) (1959)
- Beam: 96 ft 10.625 in (29.53 m) (pontoons); 78 ft 4 in (23.88 m) (inside top); 71 ft 7.375 in (21.83 m) (inside bottom); 103 ft 9.5 in (31.64 m) (1959)
- Draft: 20 ft 0 in (6.10 m) (on blocks, 1899); 21 ft 0 in (6.40 m) (ditto, 1959)
- Depth of hold: 10 ft 10.625 in (3.32 m) (center); 9 ft 2.750 in (2.81 m) (pontoon side)

Wilhelmina Drydock of ADM, in Dutch Wilhelminadok was the third steel floating dry dock in Amsterdam. It was built because in December 1896, a new lock in the North Sea Canal increased the size of ships that could reach the city.

Wilhelmina Drydock was owned by the ship repair company Amsterdamsche Droogdok Maatschappij. It was of course important for inspecting, maintaining and repairing vessels that used the port of Amsterdam. Other ships came to the city specifically to use the dry dock. Wilhelmina Drydock was also used in the later stages of constructing several ocean liners and warships.

Only twelve years after being taken into use, Wilhelminadok was outclassed by ADM commissioning a new, much larger floating dry dock. In 1959, Wilhelminadok was made longer and wider. In 1980, it was decommissioned when it was not included in ADM's successor company ADM BV.

== Context ==
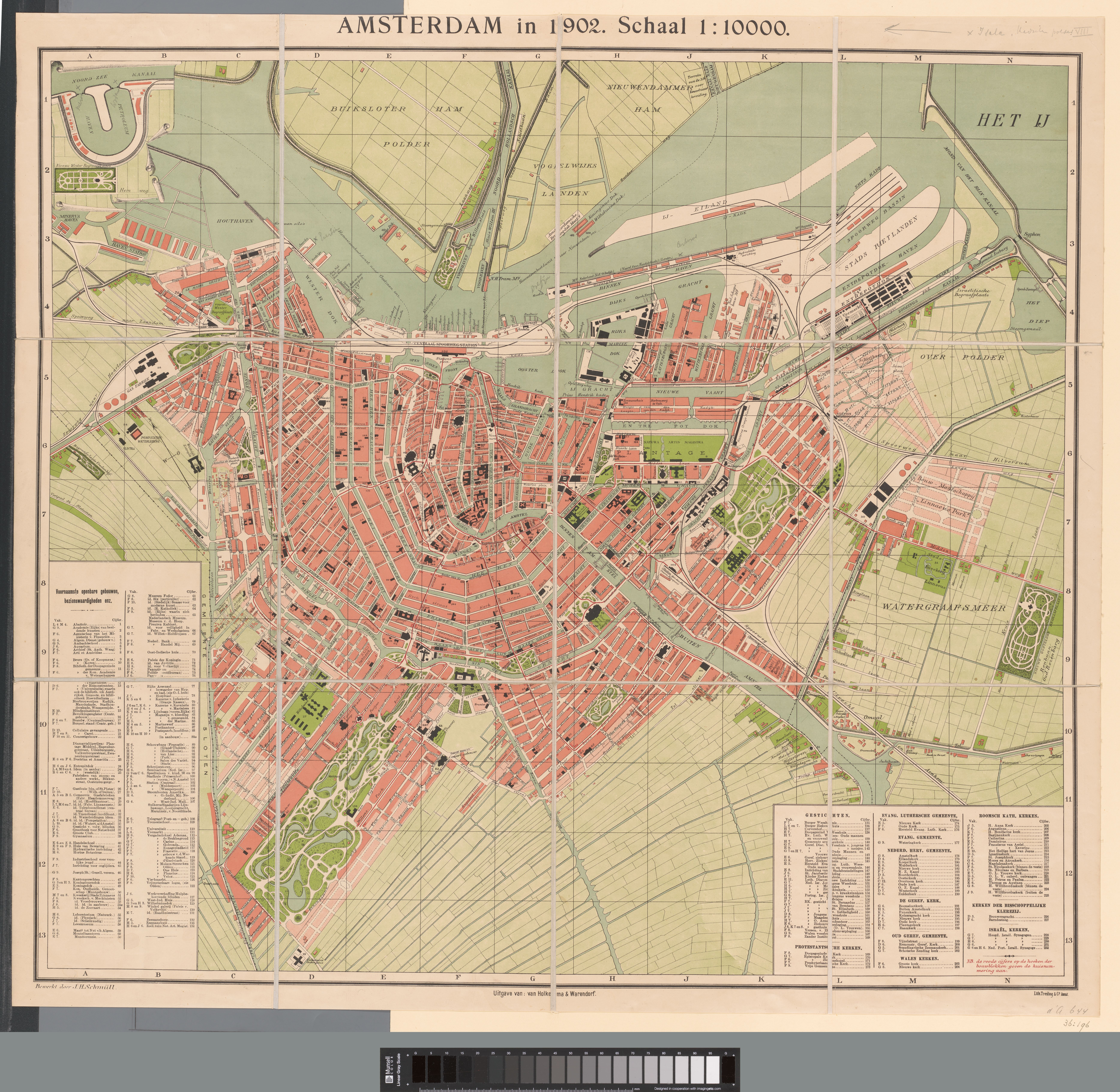
1902 map showing ADM's 3 dry docks

In 1869, the Suez Canal opened. This made it economically feasible to use steamships in the trade to the far east. Amsterdam merchants wanted to ensure that their city would keep its share of the trade to the Dutch East Indies. They therefore founded the Stoomvaart Maatschappij Nederland (SMN), which ordered some steamships in the United Kingdom.

At the time, the steamships of the SMN could not reach Amsterdam. They had to operate from the port of Nieuwediep, where the ships were serviced by the Dutch Navy's dry docks.

The North Sea Canal was opened 1876. The plans for the canal were related to the introduction of steam propulsion. By the time they were executed, the canal also had to make Amsterdam accessible to ocean liners like those of the SMN. When the canal was opened, it had not yet reached the depth that these required. This happened only in the final months of 1878.

In order to create dry dock capacity in Amsterdam, SMN helped to found the Amsterdamsche Droogdok Maatschappij (ADM). In April 1879, ADM opened its first dry dock, Koninginnedok. A competitor, the Nederlandsche Droogdok Maatschappij (NDM), opened its own dry dock and shipyard in late 1879. In October 1884, ADM eliminated this competition by acquiring the facilities of the NDM. It then renamed NDM's dry dock to Koningsdok.

The North Sea Canal soon became too small. In 1881–1883 it was made deeper, but the North Sea locks were the real bottleneck. These could not service ships that were larger than 115 by 17.75 m with a draft of 7–7.20 m. In December 1896, a new lock was opened. This was 205 m long with a breadth of 25 m and a depth of 10 m. The existing dry docks of the ADM would not be able to service the ships for which this new lock was built.

== Ordering and construction ==
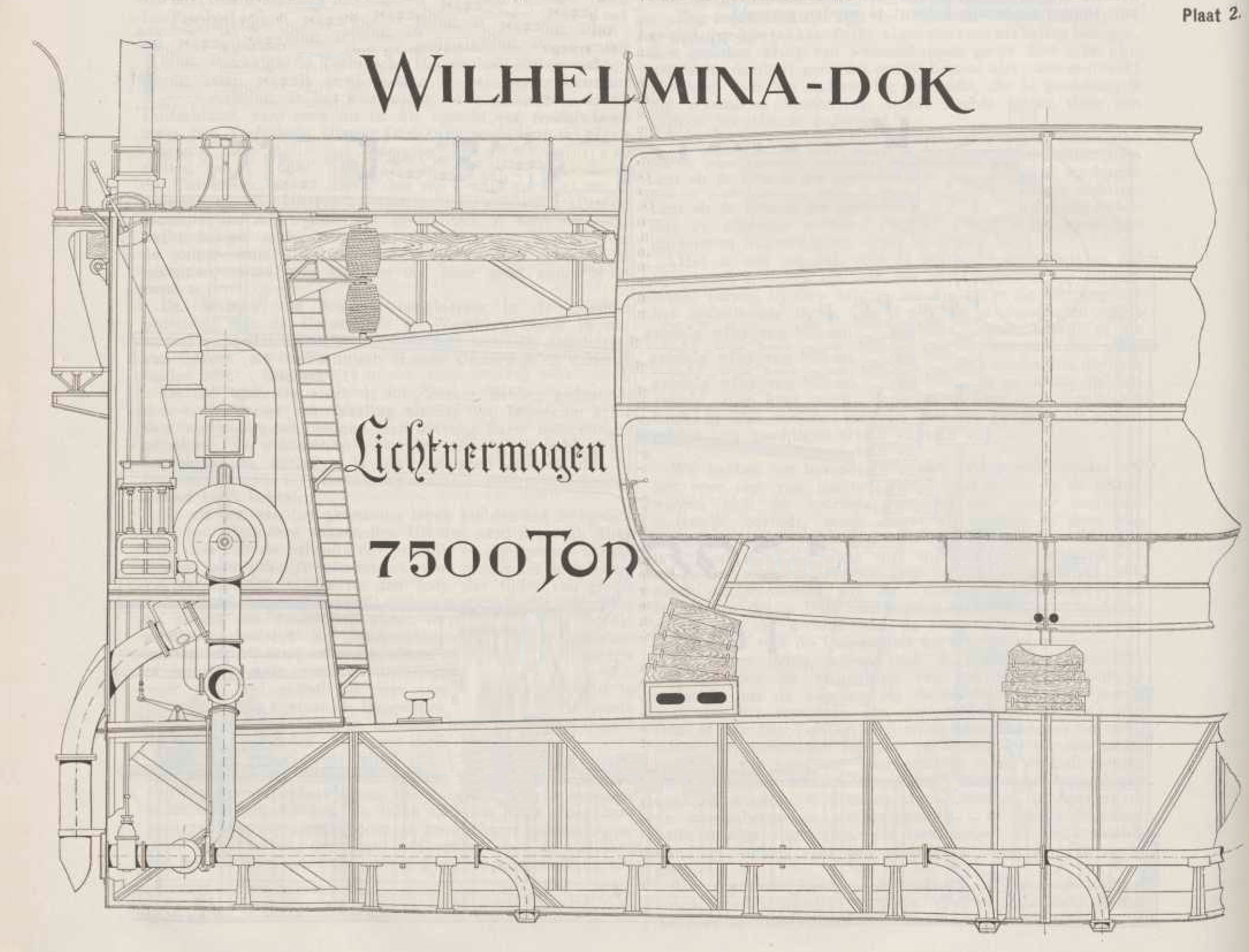
Cross section of Wilhelmina Drydock published 1903

Already in 1885, ADM got an option on a piece of water south of Koninginnedok, so it could place a third, larger dry dock there. These plans came to nothing. There were also plans to increase the capacity of Koninginnedok, but these were also not executed.

On 25 March 1897, the board of ADM was authorized to issue bonds to build a new dry dock of about 7,000 ton lift capacity. The company then issued 650 bonds of 1000 guilders at 3.5%. 300 were taken by investors, while 350 were offered to the public in September 1897. In early October 1897, it became known that the order for the new dry dock of 7,500 ton had been given to the Nederlandsche Scheepsbouw Maatschappij (NSM) for about 700,000 guilders.

The NSM hired a temporary terrain 'next to Koningsdok' for the construction of the new dry dock. It planned to launch all six pontoons of the dry dock in 1898 and to complete the dry dock on April 1, 1899. On 24 September 1898, the first of the six pontoons of Wilhelmina Drydock was launched. On 11 October 1898 the second pontoon was launched. On 22 October the third pontoon was launched. On 3 December the fourth pontoon was launched. The fifth pontoon was launched on 24 December. On 28 January 1899 the sixth, final pontoon was launched.

Several other local firms were involved in the construction of Wilhelminadok. The 3,800t of steel required for the dock was to be delivered by Joh. A. van Laer.

On 1 May 1899, five tugboats pulled Wilhelmina Drydock from the construction site near Koningsdok to its semi-permanent mooring place next to Koninginnedok.

== Characteristics ==
=== Original ===
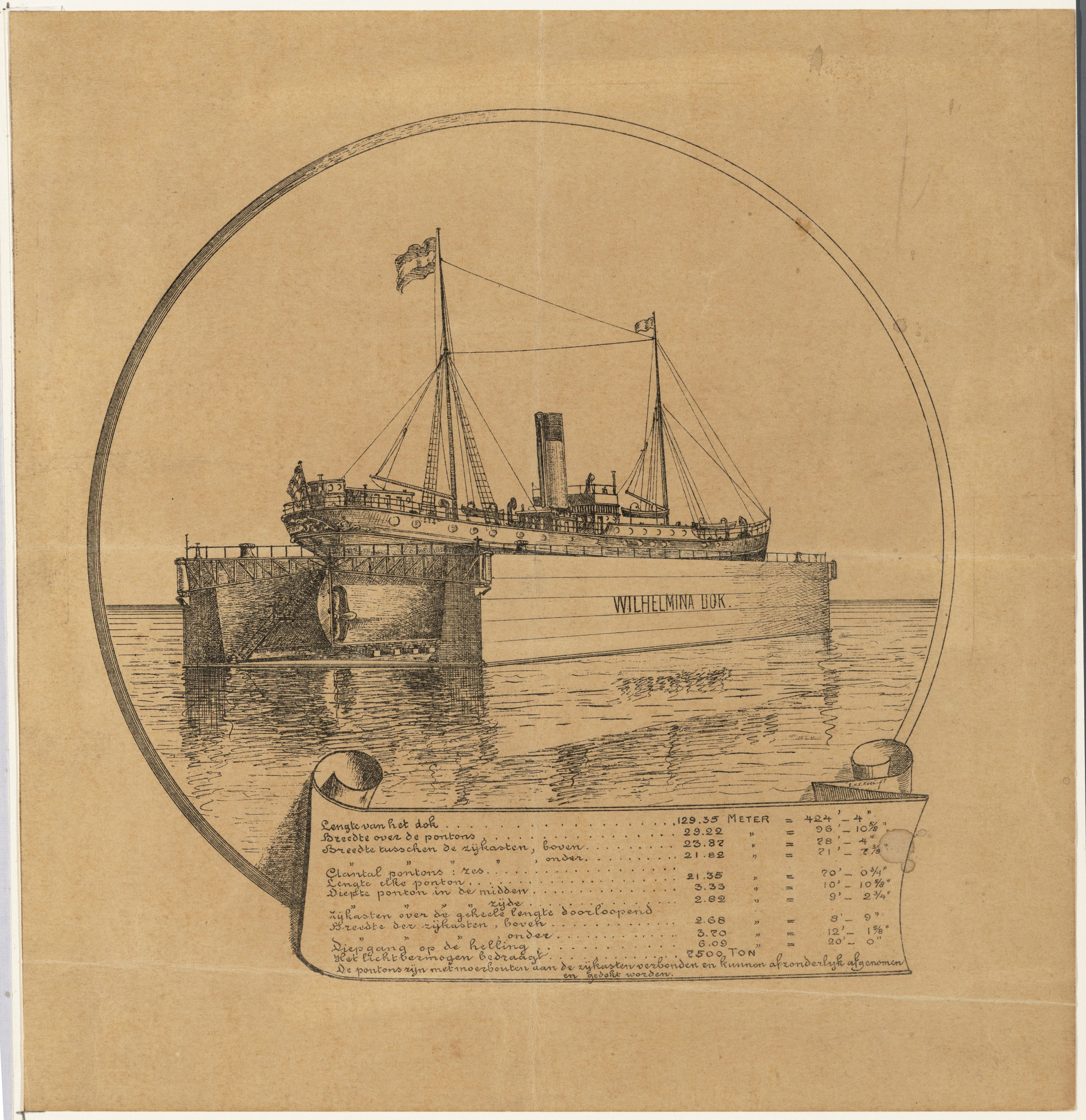
Wilhelmina Drydock with measurements

When Wilhelmina Drydock was built, it was still very common for continental shipyards to use English measurements. Wilhelmina Drydock was 424 ft 4 in (129.34 m) long and had a beam of 96 ft 10.625 in (29.53 m) over the pontoons. Wilhelmina Drydock consisted of six steel pontoons and two sides on top of the whole. It was a self-docking dry dock. Each pontoon could be detached from the sides and be docked in the rest of the dry dock.

Each pontoon was 70 ft 0.750 in (21.36 m) long, and had a beam of 96 ft 10.625 in (29.53 m). The pontoons had a depth of hold of 10 ft 10.625 in (3.32 m) in the center and 9 ft 2.750 in (2.81 m) at the sides. The sides themselves were 12 ft 1.625 in (3.70 m) wide at the floor and 8 ft 9 in (2.67 m) wide at the top. Each pontoon weighed 440,000 kg and could lift 1,250 ton.

For practical use, the measurements of a dry dock differ from the usual outer dimensions. The length on the blocks gives the length of the part of the keel that the dock can support. For floating dry docks, this is generally the same as the total length. The depth on the blocks is the amount of water above the keel blocks when the dry dock is fully submerged, this was 20 ft 0 in (6.10 m). The width between the sides was also crucial. For Wilhelminadok, this was 78 ft 4 in (23.88 m) at the top of the sides and 71 ft 7.375 in (21.83 m) at the floor.

The machinery of Wilhelmina Drydock was all below deck. This was a big improvement over the four little houses on top of Koninginnedok, which hindered operation. There were three sets of machinery. Each consisted of a boiler, a compound steam engine, and a centrifugal pump of 18 inch. The lift capacity was 7,500 ton. The heaviest ship could be set dry in 2.5 hours.

Another improvement over ADM's previous Koninginnedok was that the suction pipes of the centrifugal pumps ended in the gutters under the pontoons, which made it possible to pump the dock completely dry. Otherwise, the pumps would stop once they began to suck up air, which happened if there was only 10–15 cm of water left above the inlet.

=== After the 1959 change ===
In the 1950s, Wilhelminadok was enlarged, see below. This was done by adding a seventh pontoon to the dock. This had the same length as the others, i.e. 70 ft 0.750 in (21.36 m) and brought the length of the dock to 151 m. The beam of this new pontoon was higher, increasing the beam of the dock to 31.63 m. The other six pontoons were then changed to the same beam. The sides were made longer and put further apart.

The entrance width of the dry dock was increased to 23 m. The harbor was made a bit deeper below the dock, which made it possible to increase the depth on the blocks to 21 ft 0 in (6.40 m). The enlarged dock could lift 10,000t, which made it suitable to lift ship of 16,000 dwt.

== Service ==
=== Moored next to Koninginnedok ===
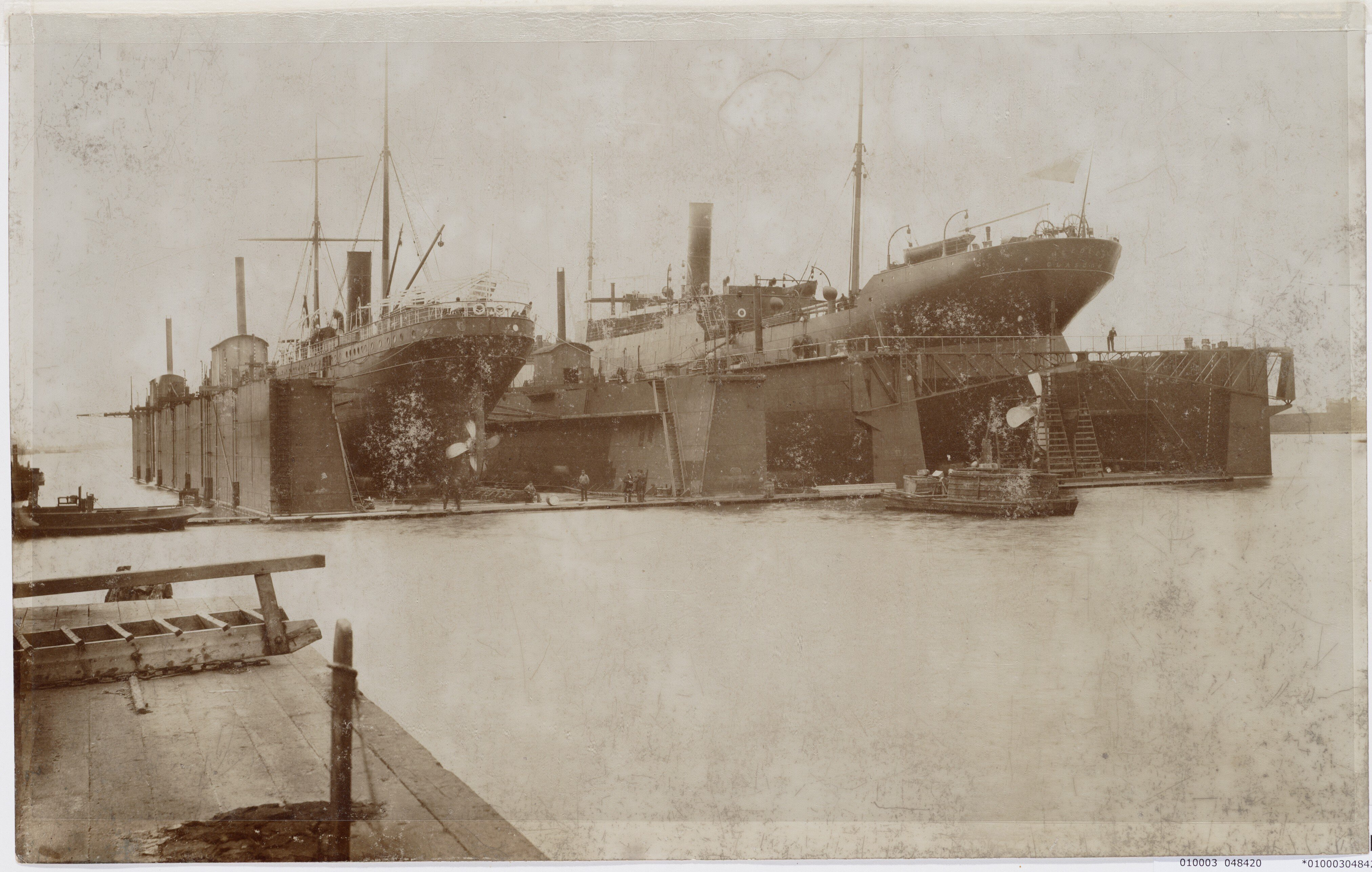
SS Needles on Wilhelmina Drydock, 17 May 1899

On 13 May 1899, SS Koningin Wilhelmina of the SMN was the first ship to be lifted by Wilhelmina Drydock. On 14 May, the dock was opened in the presence of a lot of authorities. Part of the ceremony was that the visitors climbed a side of the dock and had lunch in the first class saloon of the ocean liner. Wilhelmina Drydock got a place next to Koninginnedok on its southeast side.

Only a few days later, on 17 May 1899, SS Needles from Glasgow was lifted by Wilhelminadok. The ship had arrived at IJmuiden with rice from Saigon. Some of its crew suffered from smallpox and were left behind over there. A photographer took the trouble to photograph Needles and another vessel, and the two drydocks on which they were, from two remote positions. This makes it likely that ADM had these pictures made to promote its new dry dock.

One of the warships that was lifted by Wilhelminadok was HNLMS Evertsen. This happened in August 1905 after she had lost her rudder near IJmuiden. Another notable repair was that of SMN's ocean liner Willem II, after she overran SS Isle of Caldy in 1906.

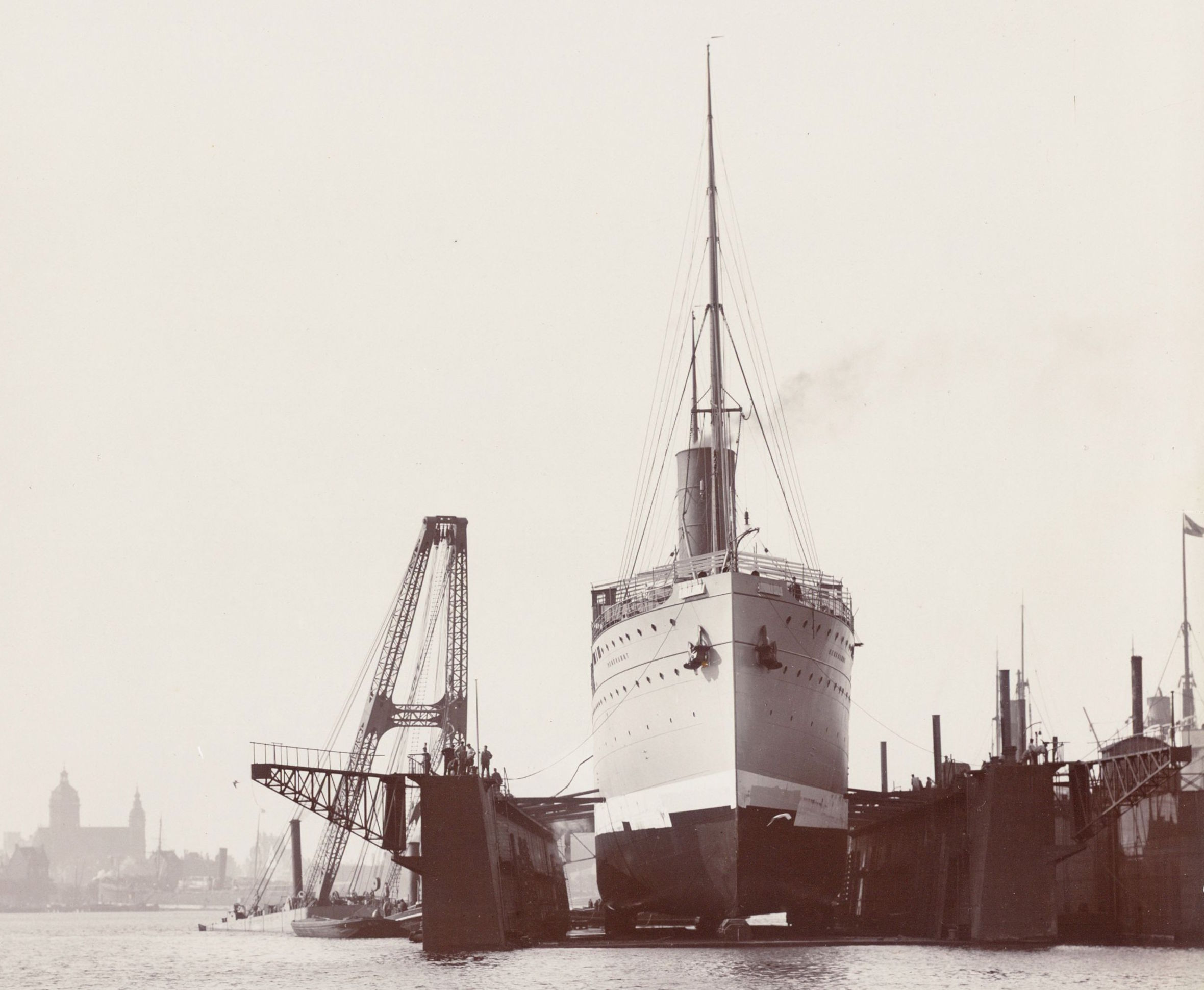
6 Oct 1906: SS Rembrandt on Wilhelmina Drydock

In late 1906, another incident showed just how important the presence of a dry dock was for local shipbuilders. When the new ocean liner Rembrandt had to pass the Oosterdok Lock in October, its bilge keels got stuck. She was then forcefully pulled through the lock. It led to an inspection in Wilhelminadok before she could make her trial run. This inspection showed that Rembrandt was not damaged. In 1907 NSM launched SS Vondel without her bilge keels. These were attached later, again using Wilhelminadok.

In July 1908, a serious accident shed some light on the work done on board Wilhelminadok at the time. Two painters were busy painting the hull of SS Grotius, when suddenly the scaffolding on which they stood gave way. This had been attached to the railing with ropes. One of the painters was killed immediately. Another laborer then commented that about a year earlier a group of laborers had refused to work on these hanging scaffolds while on the dry dock. They had then been allowed to do this while the ship was in the water. However, the hanging scaffolds had soon returned.

On 5 March 1910, the new slow armored cruiser De Zeven Provinciën was lifted by Wilhelminadok. She had been launched by the Rijkswerf on 15 March 1909 and would be commissioned on 6 October 1910. Therefore, the docking was obviously part of her construction.

=== Moored alongside Juliana Drydock ===
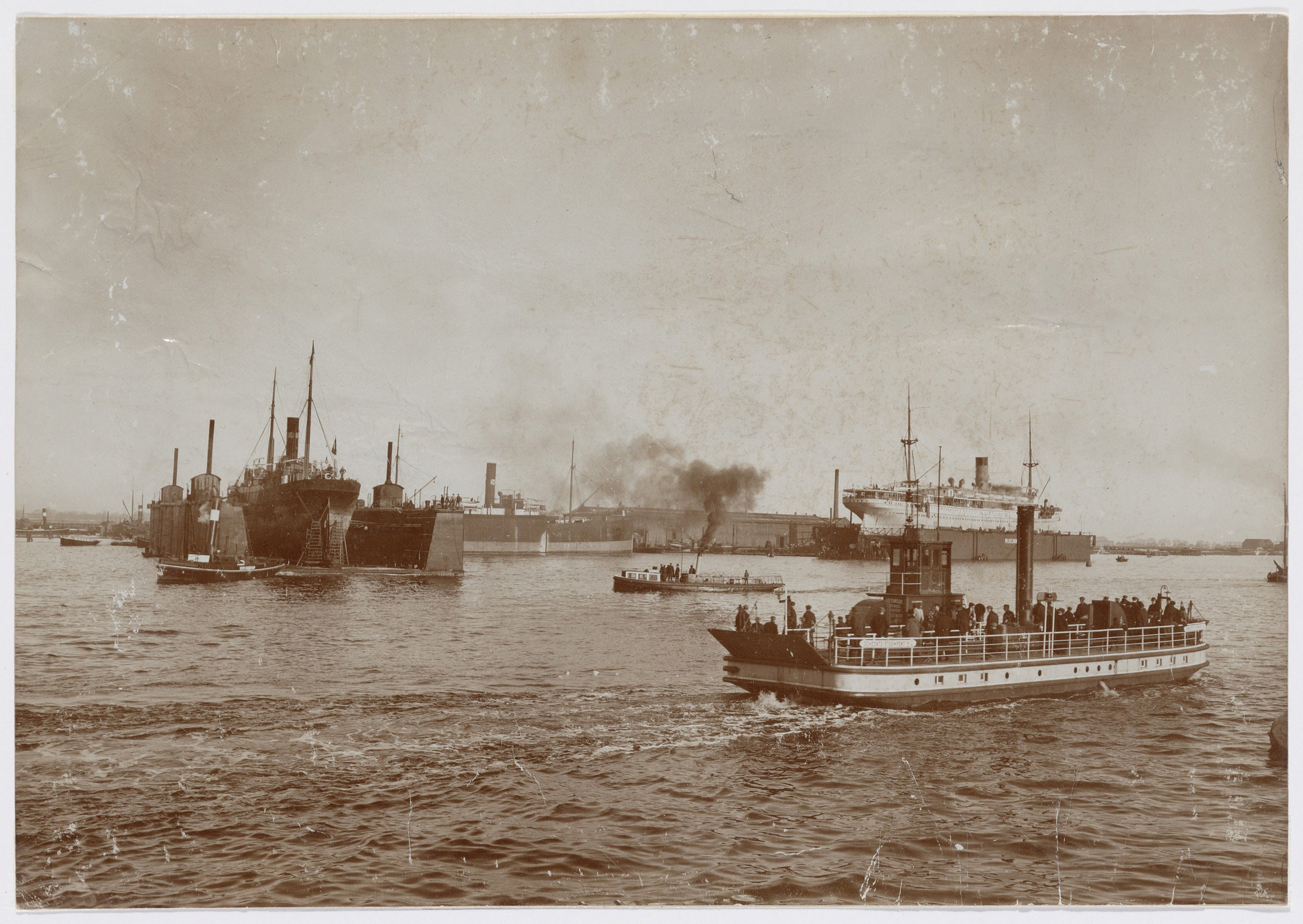
1911: Koninginnedok is moved

A short look at the dimensions of the North Sea lock that was opened in 1896, shows that Wilhelminadok was not made to service the largest ships that could reach Amsterdam. As the fleet that did visit Amsterdam progressed in size, ADM began to think of a larger dry dock. Already in 1908, it negotiated with the Amsterdam municipality about concentrating its activities near the location of Wilhelminadok. ADM's plans included the construction of a still larger dry dock. As soon as that dock of about 10,000t would be completed, Koninginnedok would be moved into a new harbor and Wilhelminadok would take her place.

The reshuffling of the dry docks took place as follows: In February 1909, Koningsdok was moved to a new dock northwest of Koninginnedok. On 13 January 1911, Koninginnedok followed. At the time, the new steamer Prinses Juliana was on Wilhelminadok. Koninginnedok was moved while carrying SS Franz Horn. Before Wilhelminadok could take the mooring place of Koninginnedok, it had to be dredged to a depth of 10.35 m below Amsterdam Ordnance Datum (NAP). In turn, the place of Wilhelminadok would be dredged down to 12.66 m for Juliana Drydock. On 8 April 1911, Wilhelminadok was moved to its new position. On 12 May 1911 Juliana Drydock was launched and took the old place of Wilhelmina Drydock.

On 9 June 1911, Queen Wilhelmina of the Netherlands and her husband visited Amsterdam. A big part of the visit was a tour of the new Juliana Drydock. While on that drydock, the queen was shown a model of Juliana Drydock and a model of Wilhelminadok with SS Koningin Wilhelmina in it. The visitors then ascended a special staircase to the top of Juliana Drydock. From there, they could see Wilhelminadok actually servicing SS Koningin Wilhelmina. Juliana Drydock could lift 12,000 ton. In 1913 it was lengthened so it could lift 16,500 ton.

The idea to moor Juliana Drydock next to Wilhelminadok soon proved troublesome, because it hindered shipping. In mid-1913, ADM and the Amsterdam municipality came to an agreement. Within three years, ADM would move Wilhelminadok to a position in an enlarged ADM dock connected to the IJ. In return, the municipality sold terrains to the ADM.

On 1 September 1915, the Nederlandsche Scheepsbouw Maatschappij (NSM) launched another dry dock also named Wilhelminadok. This could lift 13,000 ton and was meant for Wilton's Dok- en Werf Maatschappij in Rotterdam.

=== Moored alongside Koningsdok ===
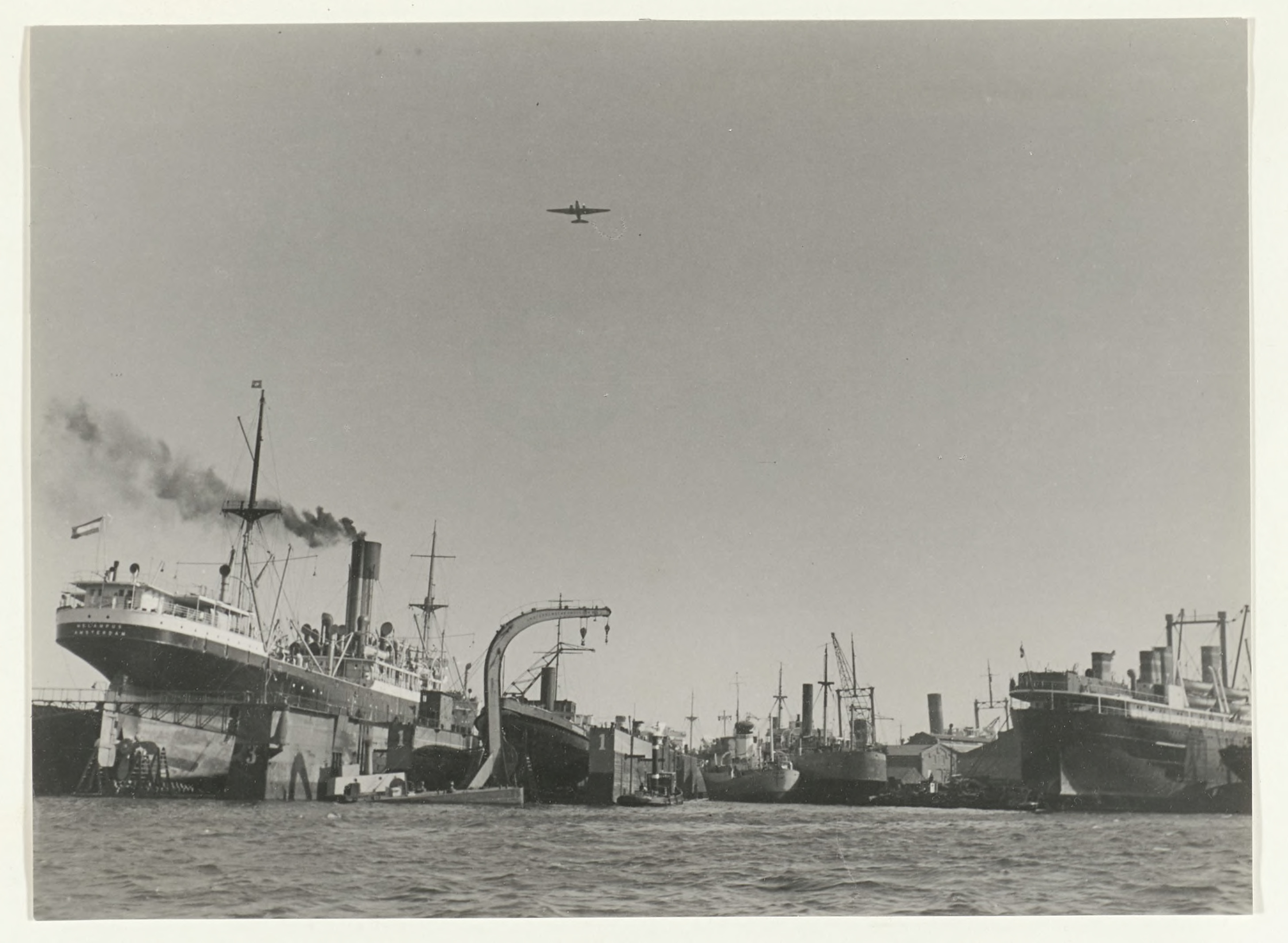
Wilhelmina Drydock (3) and Koningsdok (1), 1947

On 14 May 1917, Wilhelminadok was moved to ADM's own dock, the 'Dokhaven'. Here it was moored next to Koningsdok. Koninginnedok was then moored further back in the Dokhaven.

On 15 May 1925, ADM took the Hendrik Drydock of 25,000 ton capacity into use. This seems to contradict the story about Wilhelminadok having to move because it hindered navigation on the IJ. However, Hendrik Drydock was not moored alongside Julianadok. It was moored further to the east, just beyond the original entrance of Zijkanaal K to Nieuwendam.

In 1926, another (the third) drydock named Wilhelminadok was completed. This had been built by Rotterdamsche Droogdok Maatschappij (RDM). With a lift capacity of 3,000 ton, it was much smaller than the other two. On 22 July 1926 this Wilhelminadok arrived in Curaçao.

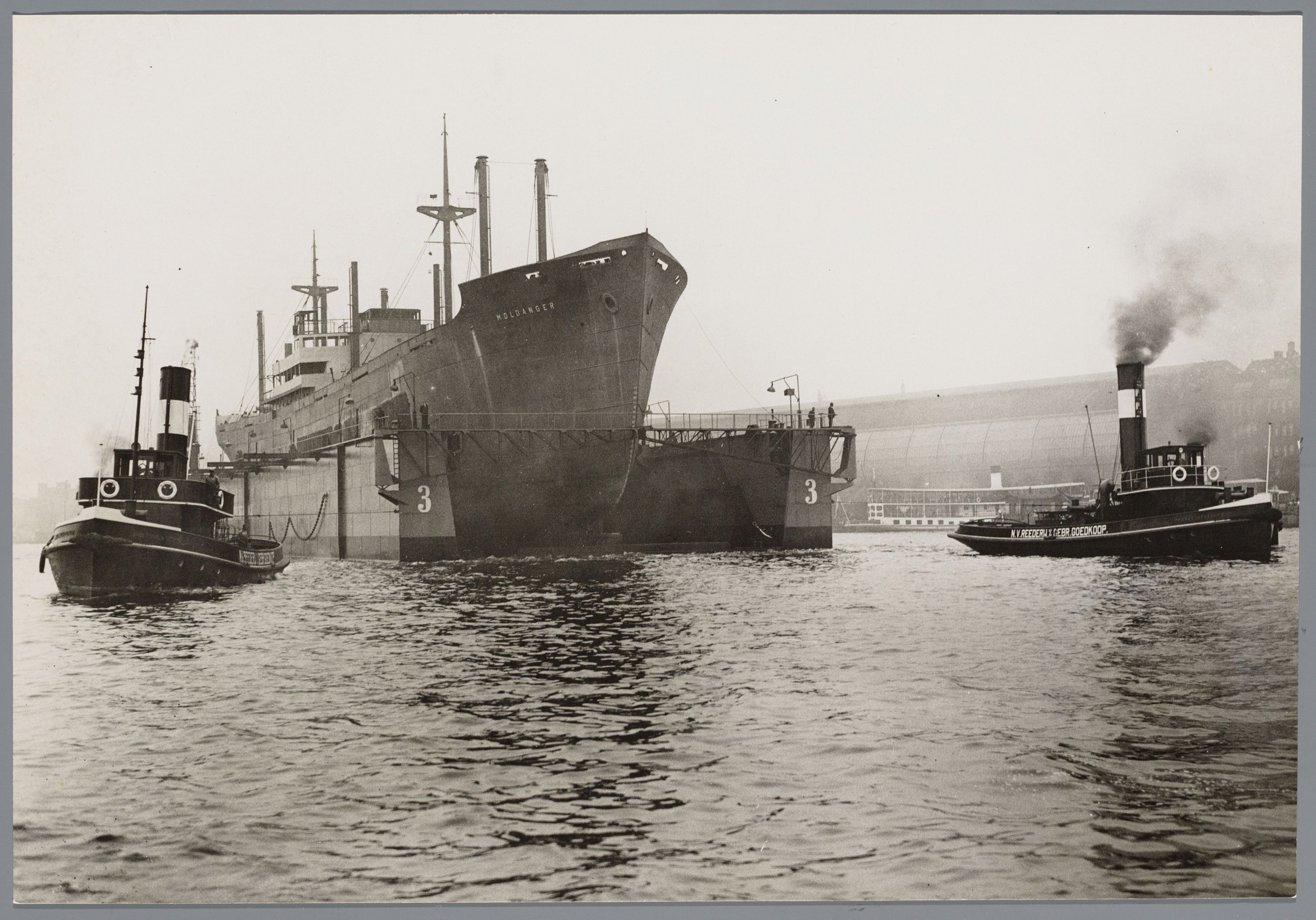
Transporting MS Moldanger on the IJ 16 August 1932

In 1932 a fire on board the new large MS Moldanger led to some remarkable events. After she was launched, a serious fire broke out on board. This was extinguished, but an accident then made that she sank in 7 m of water. After she was refloated, she was pulled to ADM, where she was lifted by Juliana Drydock. Of course, Moldanger could be repaired and finished at ADM, but it was cheaper to do this at the NSM shipyard. After the machinery had been removed, Moldanger was lifted by Wilhelminadok. On 16 August, the chains that held Wilhelminadok in place were cut, and the combination was pulled to NSM. The repairs were challenging, because a part of the ship would be taken out and replaced. Experts feared that the resulting uneven weight distribution would cause the dry dock's floor to sag, which would then bend the ship's hull.

On 6 December 1932, Wilhelminadok and Moldanger were pulled back to ADM. Wilhelminadok was first pulled westward to the Houthaven, where she was turned about. She was then pulled to ADM, where she turned again before she was carefully moved between the dolphins that kept her in place. That same day, at three o'clock, Moldanger was floated out of Wilhelminadok. The ship was then pulled back to NSM, where she arrived at 6.

Later in the 1930s, there were several small fires on board ships that were docked on Wilhelminadok. Wilhelminadok became a bit more important to ADM after it sold Juliana Drydock to Danzig in 1938. An interesting repair job was that of the steamboat Friesland. She had sunk on the IJsselmeer on 16 January 1940 while she attempted to break through the ice with an ice plow. In late March, Friesland was refloated and put in Dok 3 to be inspected.

Wilheminadok survived World War II without significant damage. After Hendrik Drydock was sunk by the occupiers in 1944, it again became ADM's largest dry dock. This lasted till March 1950, when Hendrik Drydock had been repaired, and given the number '4'.

=== Wilhelminadok is lengthened and widened ===
In the mid-1950s Wilhelmina Drydock was changed to become longer and wider. By then, it could only just handle the ubiquitous Liberty ship. Vessels like the Type C3-class ship, the T2 tankers and other 12,000 to 15,000 dwt ships were too large. This caused that Dok 4 (Hendrik Drydock suitable for ships up to 35,000 dwt), could not handle the demand for servicing larger ships. In 1953, ADM emitted extra shares for one million guilders to pay for part of this reconstruction. In 1954, 1955, and 1956, this work was delayed because ADM was very busy.

In 1956 the plans became known. While it was not unusual to lengthen a drydock, Wilhelminadok would also be made wider. During the change, Wilhelminadok would remain in use. By adding a seventh pontoon of the same length, the dock's total length would increase by 21 m. However, the new pontoon would also be about 2.5 m wider, meaning that the other six pontoons would also be widened. This would bring the dock's beam to about 32 m. During the process, the widened pontoons were placed so that each stuck out at a different side, keeping the whole balanced.

During 1958 much progress was made. By April, the seventh, wider, pontoon had been built and substituted for one of the others. In Dock IV, this old pontoon had then been made wider. In turn this had been exchanged, etc. By then, only two pontoons still had to be widened. In the final stages of the change, the dock was moved to dredge the harbor. It was also out of use for a few weeks while the sides were put further apart and the seventh pontoon was attached. On 12 September 1959, the enlarged dock was taken into use by lifting MS Beaverbank from Belfast.

== The End ==
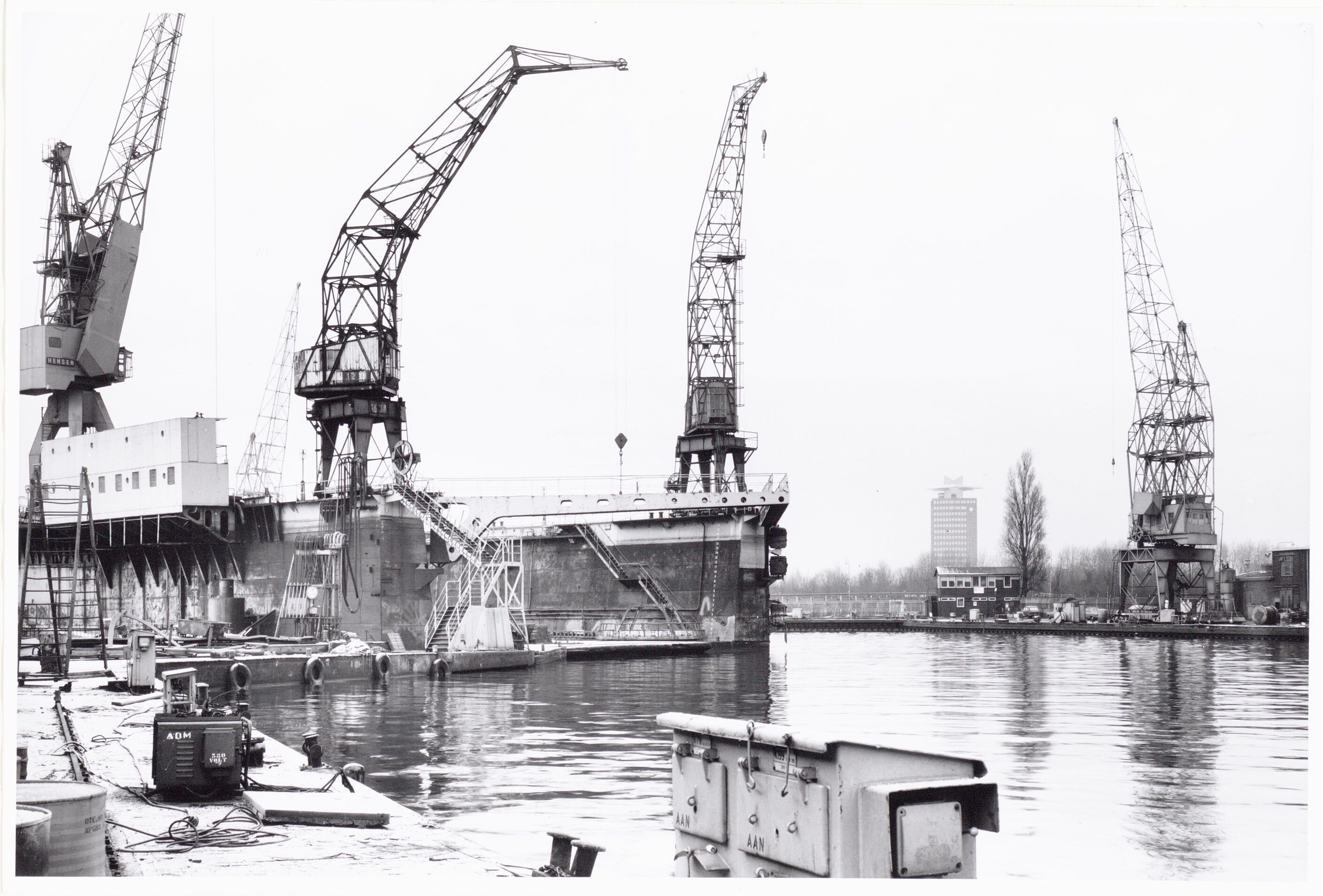
The stern of Wilhelmina Drydock on 10 January 1980

Starting in the 1960s, the shipbuilding and -repair industry in the Netherlands went downhill. In 1978, the Dutch government put enormous pressure on ADM NV to agree to a merger with the NDSM. The board of ADM NV finally agreed to merge its operations with those of NDSM, which led to the foundation of ADM BV. ADM NV kept the very valuable grounds of the old ADM out of the merger. The same applied to two of its dry docks.

From a list of dry docks at ADM BV, it's known that ADM BV had two floating docks of 27,000 and 41,000 dwt capacity. We also know that Koningsdok was sold to Welgelegen shipyard in Harlingen. Therefore, Wilhelminadok and Koninginnedok were the two dry docks that ADM NV kept out of the merger. This is also confirmed by a series of photos made of the terrain on 10 January 1980. These photos show these two docks. It makes sense that these old docks were not transferred to ADM BV, because the new shipyard was very modern.

Soon after the series of photos was taken, Wilhelminadok was pulled out of the harbor. It's not yet known was happened next.
