= Peter J Sterkenburg =

Dutch painter

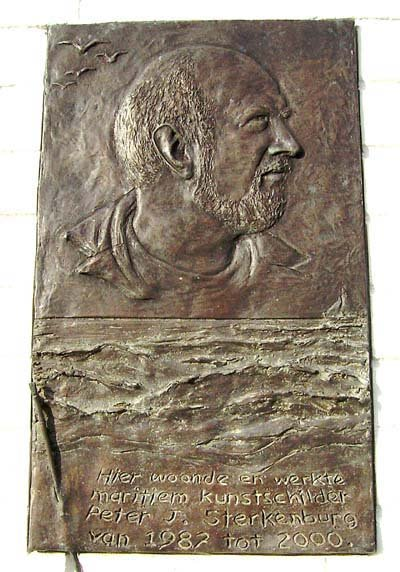
Peter Sterkenburg

Peter Sterkenburg (Harlingen, 15 December 1955 - Zurich (Netherlands), 2000) was a Dutch autodidact painter of maritime scenes.

== Early life ==
Sterkenburg was born in the port of Harlingen, Netherlands in 1955. While young, he encountered the sea and later remembered how he, as a toddler, had noted the coming and going of the ships in the harbour. His father was a sailor in the Dutch merchant navy. During secondary school he showed a talent for drawing, and after his tour of duty in the Dutch army he decided to turn his passion into his livelihood.

== Career ==
During his career Sterkenburg developed a unique, easily recognizable, romantic painting style. The sea and ships became a thread throughout his life. His seascapes are found in collections all over the world. He participated in exhibitions in the Netherlands, San Francisco, Hong Kong, Singapore, Kuala Lumpur, Jakarta and Sydney. Many of his pieces were special commissions.

His last assignment was a painting commissioned by VFD, a Dutch architectural company responsible for the decoration of the cruise ships of the Holland America Line. This seven meter-long painting, shows 17th century sailing vessels of the Dutch East India Company, the VOC, before Amsterdam. Sterkenburg was unable to complete this painting as he died on the day before Easter in 2000 at age 44. One year later a foundation was established to promote his work.

== Technique ==
Sterkenburg employed a so-called ‘wet’ painter technique whereby he did not wait for the paint to fully dry. He would first sketch the outlines of a painting in charcoal. He sometimes applied as many as twenty-five thin layers, giving the painting a realistic effect. As a finishing touch, he accentuated the light with a fine brush to suggest more depth. Despite the realism of his paintings, Sterkenburg was not considered to be a genuine ‘fijnschilder’, a painter of ‘delicate subjects’. He had a preference for linen of a rather coarse texture. He was capable of painting the rigging of his ships meticulously on this comparatively rough surface. The ‘rigging’ brush he used for this purpose, made of sable hair, allowed him to apply only a small quantity of paint each time – resulting in short strokes joined together – but this technique cannot be detected in the final result, in which the lines seem to be continuous. This gives the spectator the impression that everything is worked out in detail.

The faces of the members of a ship's crew are mere spots, a few strokes with a dry brush conjure up the fine-meshed net of a fishing vessel and his fluffy clouds are done with a few coarse strokes. Paintings with historical ships and backgrounds required research. In order to paint as true to life as possible, Sterkenburg frequently consulted his extensive collection of books on historical and maritime matters. He possessed a photographic memory, enabling him to depict a certain ship twice and from completely different angles. In order to depict modern ships correctly he used a camera on-site but only used the details, never directly copying photos. One of his principles was that he could not paint the correct light, sky- and water colour before he had actually visited the places which formed the background in his paintings. This resulted in study trips to ports around the world.

== Exhibitions ==
- 1978 Hardegaryp
- 1980 Breukelen
- 1985 San Francisco
- 1986 A.J. Koster Galery, Schoorl
- 1988 A.J. Koster Galery, Schoorl
- 1992 Repulse Bay Hotel, Hong Kong
- 1994 Regent Hotel, Kuala Lumpur
- 1994 Hollandse Club, Singapore
- 1994 Erasmus Huis, Djakarta
- 1994 Hilton Hotel, Sydney
- 2001 Hannemahuis, Harlingen
- 2004 Westfries Museum, Hoorn
- 2015 Visserijmuseum Zoutkamp, Zoutkamp
- 2015 Fries Scheepvaartmuseum, Sneek

== Gallery ==
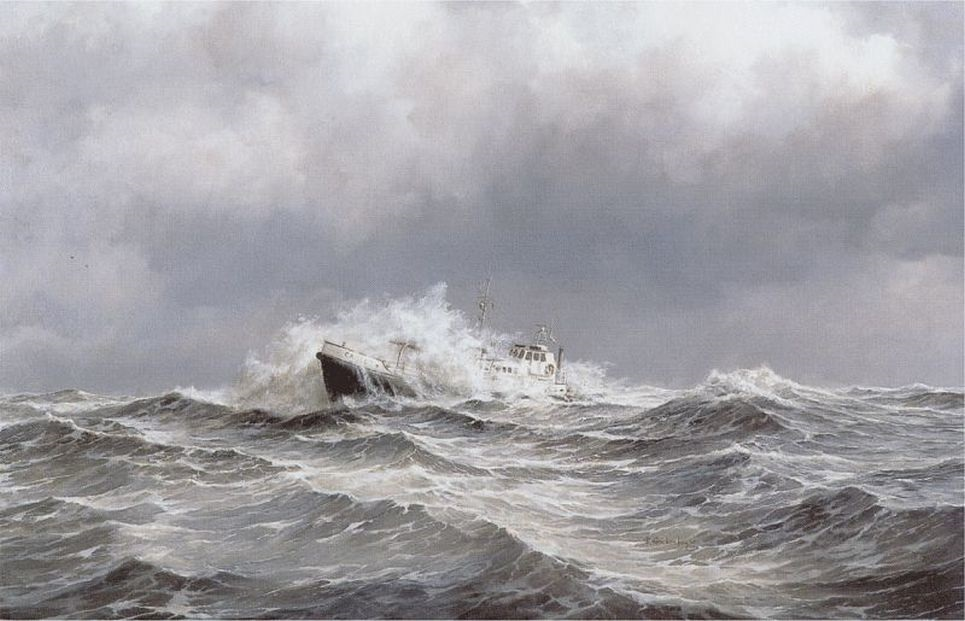
Lifeboat Carlot.

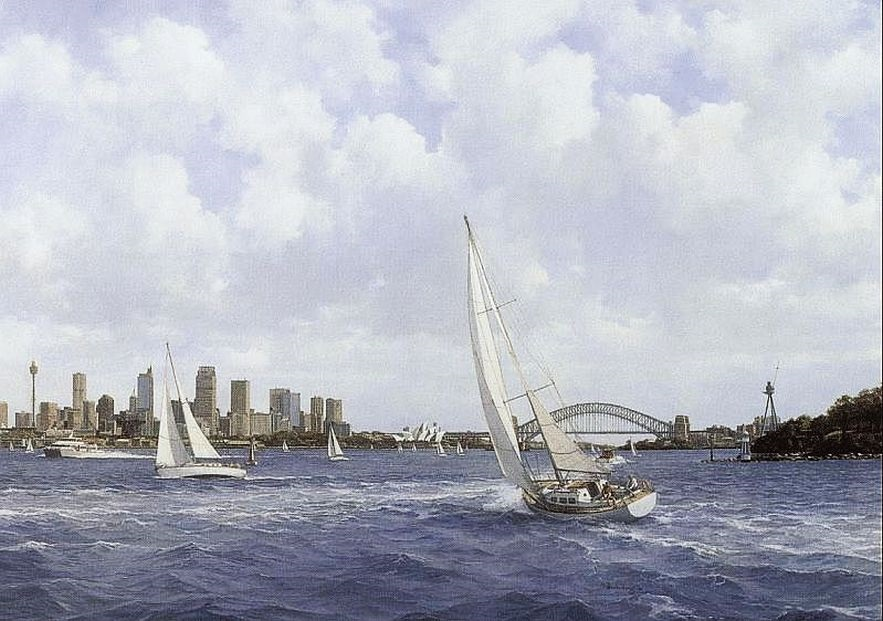
Sydney Harbor.

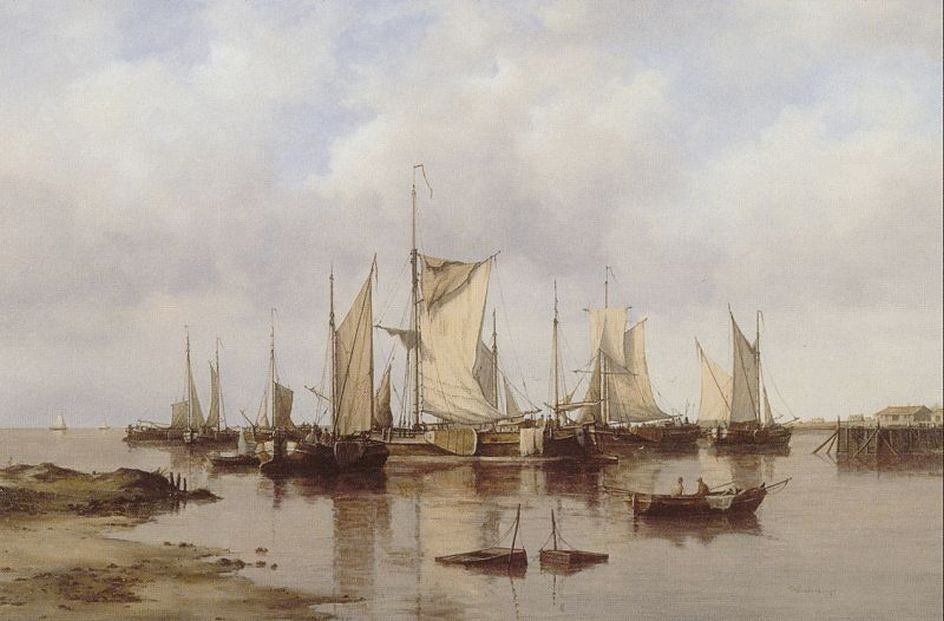
Tjalks in calm weather.

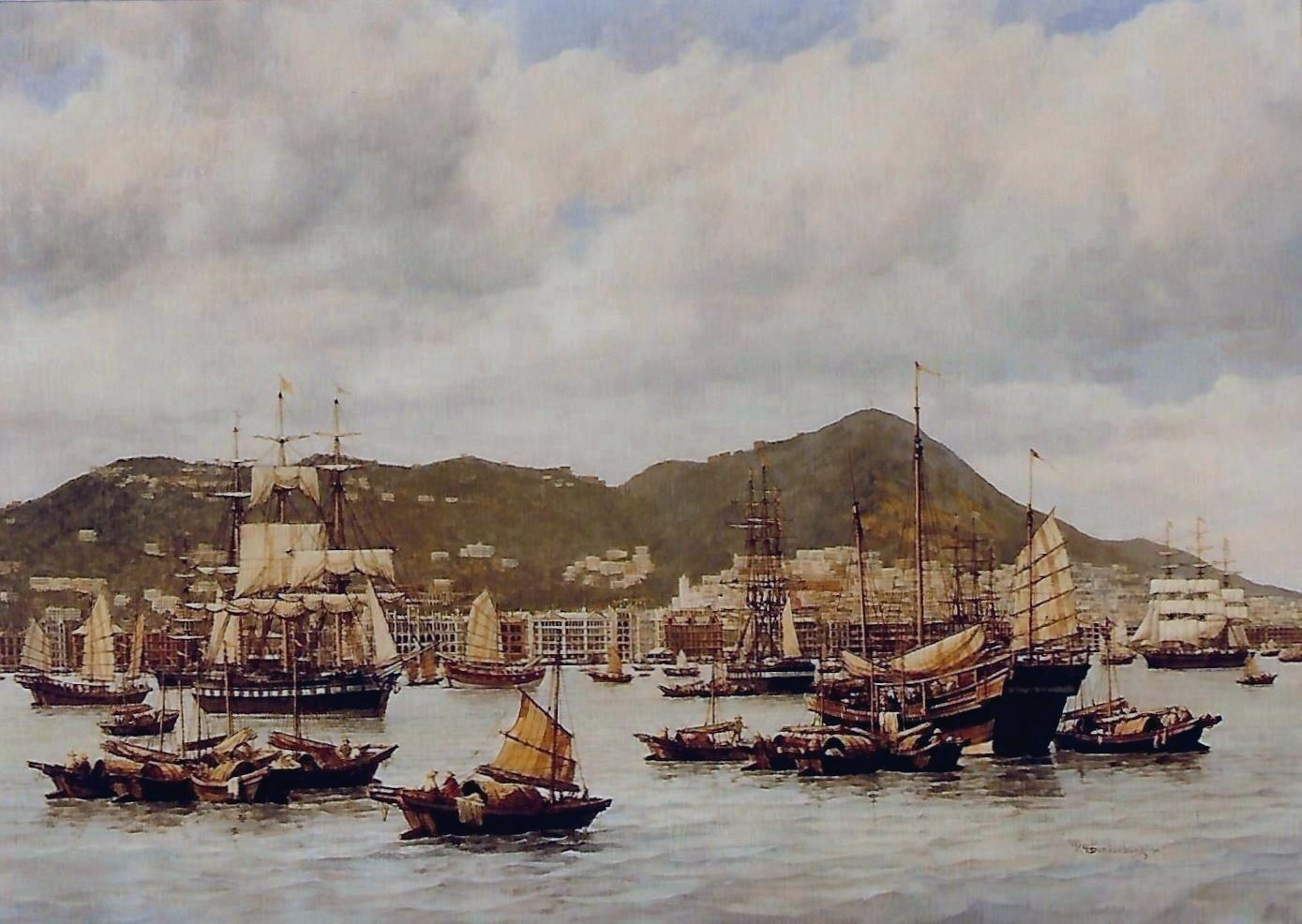
Ships in Victoria Harbour Hong Kong
