= Amsterdamsche Droogdok Maatschappij =

Dutch company

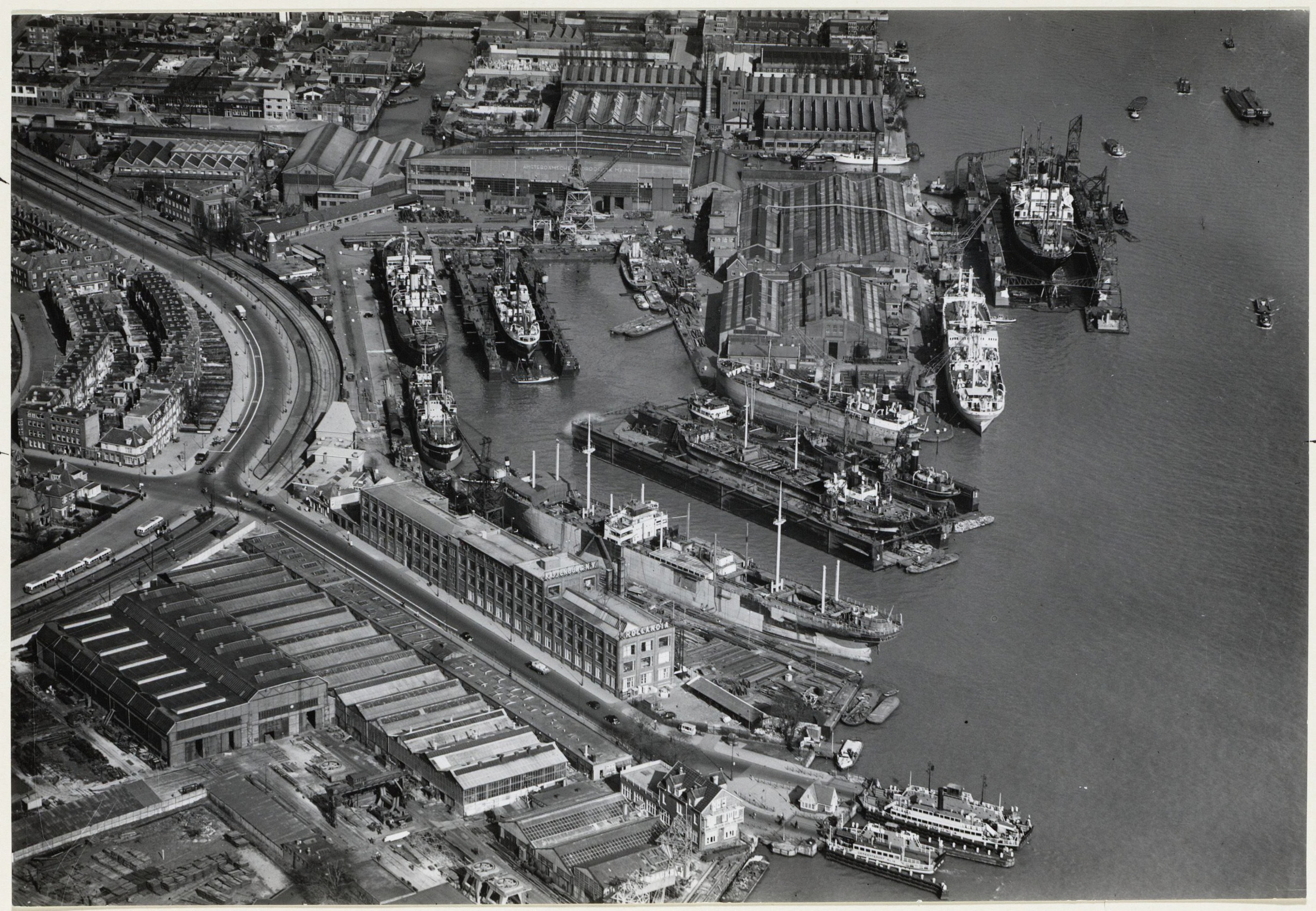
- The ADM with five dry docks in use, 1950
- Industry: Ship repair
- Founded: 4 September 1877
- Defunct: 1985
- Fate: Merged with Nederlandsche Dok en Scheepsbouw Maatschappij NV (NDSM) in 1978
- Headquarters: Amsterdam, Netherlands

Amsterdamsche Droogdok Maatschappij (ADM) was a Dutch company that repaired ships using dry docks in Amsterdam, Netherlands. After World War II it also built some ships.

== Context ==
=== Port of Amsterdam ===
By the early 19th century the once famous commercial center Amsterdam had a very poor connection to the sea. The situation improved by the construction of the Noordhollandsch Kanaal, completed in 1824. It soon turned out that by itself, the canal did not create a suitable port for Amsterdam. This was done by creating the wet docks Oosterdok and Westerdok. Outside of these docks, docking was hindered by tides and other inconveniences. Inside these docks, the 'Rederij der Drijvende Droogdokken' (floating dry docks shipping line) built three wooden floating dry docks in the 1840s. The first of these, Amsterdam Wooden Drydock I can be considered to have been the first modern floating dry dock in Europe.

=== The North Sea Canal ===
By the 1850s it was clear that Amsterdam needed a more direct connection to the North Sea. This would lead to the construction of the North Sea Canal, opened in November 1876. The new canal had a lock that could service ships of 120 m by 18 m and with a draft of 8 m. The canal only reached the first required depth of 6.5 m in October 1878. Meanwhile the IJ Bay was closed off by a dam east of Amsterdam.

It all meant that larger ships could reach Amsterdam. These could not (easily) reach, and would not fit the existing dry docks. Meanwhile the closure of the IJ had created new possible locations for (floating) dry docks, while the existing ones were locked up in the old wet docks.

== Foundation of ADM ==
=== Stoomvaart Maatschappij Nederland ===
Stoomvaart Maatschappij Nederland (SMN) was a shipping line founded in 1870. Its goal was to operate a regular service to the Dutch East Indies with steamships via the Suez Canal. To do this it bought four very large ships, e.g. SS Willem III. These did not fit the Noordhollandsch Kanaal, and therefore the company had to operate from Nieuwediep. SMN wanted to operate from Amsterdam as soon as the North Sea Canal was deep enough. However, at Nieuwediep the navy base Willemsoord had a dry dock which was suitable for the SMN ships, and which the navy made available to help SMN. When the opening of the North Sea Canal became imminent, the board of SMN asked its shareholders for permission to participate in a company to establish a suitable dry dock in Amsterdam. In the general shareholders meeting of 4 May 1875, this permission was granted for up to 500,000 guilders.

=== ADM is founded ===
The ADM plan was conceived by A.A. Bienfait, J. Boissevain, P.E. Tegelberg and G.A. Tindal. They first had engineers design a plan for a dry dock that could receive the biggest ship that could pass the North Sea lock of the canal. They then asked the municipality for a place to station the dry dock and to build a repair shipyard. For all of this, they had the support of SMN.

The founders then started to raise funding. There would be 400 shares at 1,000 guilders each. They first contracted for 250 shares with SMN, and perhaps others. On 24 July 1877 they then opened the subscription to 150 shares, and 500 bonds of 1,000 guilders. The offer succeeded for the shares, but the public took less shares than expected. Placing the bonds was also problematic. Only 405 bonds were taken, and so the bond offer was extended to the 27th. The extension indeed succeeded in placing the other 95 bonds.

In 1877 there was also a competing plan for a large dry dock in Amsterdam. This was made by C. and J. von Lindern from Alblasserdam, and would also be realized. This might also explain the interest of SMN. If somebody (i.e. Von Lindern) created a suitable dry dock in Amsterdam or at Nieuwediep, the government would no longer allow the use of the navy dry dock at Willemsoord. Such a situation would become very problematic for SMN if the only suitable dry dock at Amsterdam was occupied. The only other Dutch dry dock which was long enough for the SMN ships was Middelburg Drydock.

Amsterdamsche Droogdok Maatschappij was founded by contract on 17 August 1877. Its goal would be to construct or buy, and operate one or more dry docks in Amsterdam. Furthermore to create an establishment for repairing ships, and storing and delivering coal and cargo. Of the 400 shares, major shareholders were: SMN for 270 shares and Koninklijke Nederlandse Stoomboot-Maatschappij for 25 shares. Others had smaller holdings, amongst them the people who took the initiative to found ADM. SMN would have priority use of the dry docks that the company would manage, but would not pay a lower price. The first executive board would consist of: A.A. Bienfait, J. Boissevain, P.E. Tegelberg, and G.A. Tindal. The first board therefore indeed consisted of the founders of the ADM. In late December 1877 they would be joined by Robert D. Crommelin.

=== Location ===
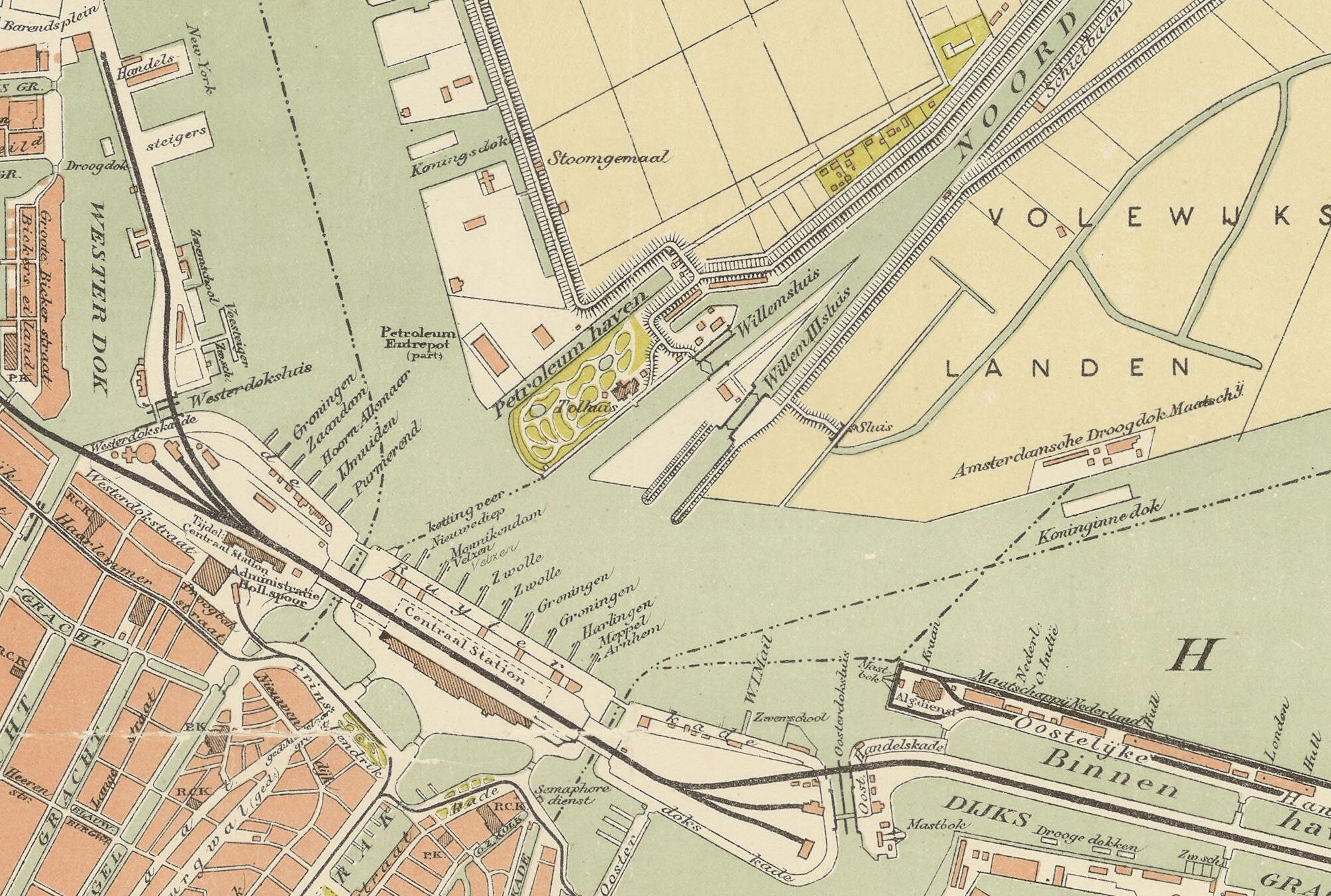
Amsterdam's six dry docks and ADM's buildings, 1888

Negotiations with the municipality about a location for the dry dock had started on 22 May 1877. On 23 August the ADM board had made a formal request for a terrain to the city government. ADM first asked for grounds next to the new Willem III Lock, which was denied. The properties committee of the Amsterdam Municipality then proposed a terrain south of the Petroleum storage for a relatively low price. This terrain was refused by ADM, and then Von Lindern showed interest in that terrain. In October the committee offered another terrain to ADM. ADM could buy 120 ares of land just east of the start of the Noordhollandsch Kanaal, on the north side of the IJ Bay. These lands belonged to the municipality and were referred to as 'Buitenvogelwijkslanden', in the eastern part of Volewijk headland. 60 ares of water could be rented to place the floating dry dock. The price for the land would be 72,000 guilders under stipulation that it could only be used for the dry dock and connected activities. Otherwise the price would be 120,000 guilders, i.e. 6 or 10 guilders per centiare. The area of water could be hired for 50 cents an are per year, i.e. 30 guilders a year.

On 22 October ADM stated that it agreed with the location, even though it differed from the one it had asked. However, it wanted to pay no more than 20,000 guilders for the land, and 60 guilders for the water. It also did not want to pay for dredging a channel towards the floating dry dock. The city government then proposed to offer the lands to ADM for 72,000 in a municipal council meeting on 7 November. Some council members wanted to sell the land for 2 guilders a centiare, or 24,000 guilders, because of the interest that Amsterdam had in attracting SMN to the city. This started a discussion in which some argued that if Amsterdam wanted to subsidize ADM in order to attract SMN, this should be done by other means, because the lower price would depreciate all grounds in the surroundings. In the end, the council lowered the price to 24,000 guilders. On 9 January 1878 the conditions of the deal were confirmed by the municipal council.

=== Koninginnedok is acquired ===
On 8 January 1878 ADM tendered the construction of its first dry dock. It was to be a floating iron dry dock for merchant and navy ships. The design was made by engineers of John Elder & Co. Shipyard. It was to be capable of lifting 4,000 tons. It would consist of two parts that could be used separately. After many parts had been built and launched separately, the dry dock was assembled, and christened Koninginnedok. On 6 May Stad Amsterdam of 360 feet and 3,319 ton was lifted successfully.

=== The repair shipyard is constructed ===
East of the dry dock, architect Van Gendt designed the repair shipyard. It consisted of workshops with a total size of 57 m by 20 m, and a separate management building 30 steps away from these. The workshops would contain a big and small steam hammer, cutting- and drilling machines, and planers, all steam driven. There would also be copper foundry, as well as all other necessities for modern ship repair. In fact, this repair shipyard would be a reincarnation of Bosch Reitz Shipyard from Den Helder. ADM bought all the inventory of that shipyard, and by laying out the new shipyard according to the same plan, all machines could be re-used without changing the line shafts and belts. Actually placing the machines would be done after the dry dock was ready.

== Operation ==
=== First years (1879–1884) ===
On 6 May 1879 ADM was in regular business with the docking of the steamer Stad Amsterdam. On 20 May 1879 it held its first general shareholders meeting at the offices of the SMN. In the first year, Koninginnedok was not that busy. ADM also acquired a so-called (vijzeldok) for smaller vessels, and was able to pay 2.5% dividend. In 1880 Koninginnedok was a bit more busy, and the Vijzeldok also had some business. Dividend over 1880 was 7.925%. SMN then offered 100 of her shares at 110% on 10 May 1881, which were sold. ADM also asked the municipality to buy 7.2 ares more land. In 1881 the dry dock was occupied about 90% of the year, and dividend was 7.99%. Over 1882 dividend was 9%.

=== Without competition (1884–1897) ===
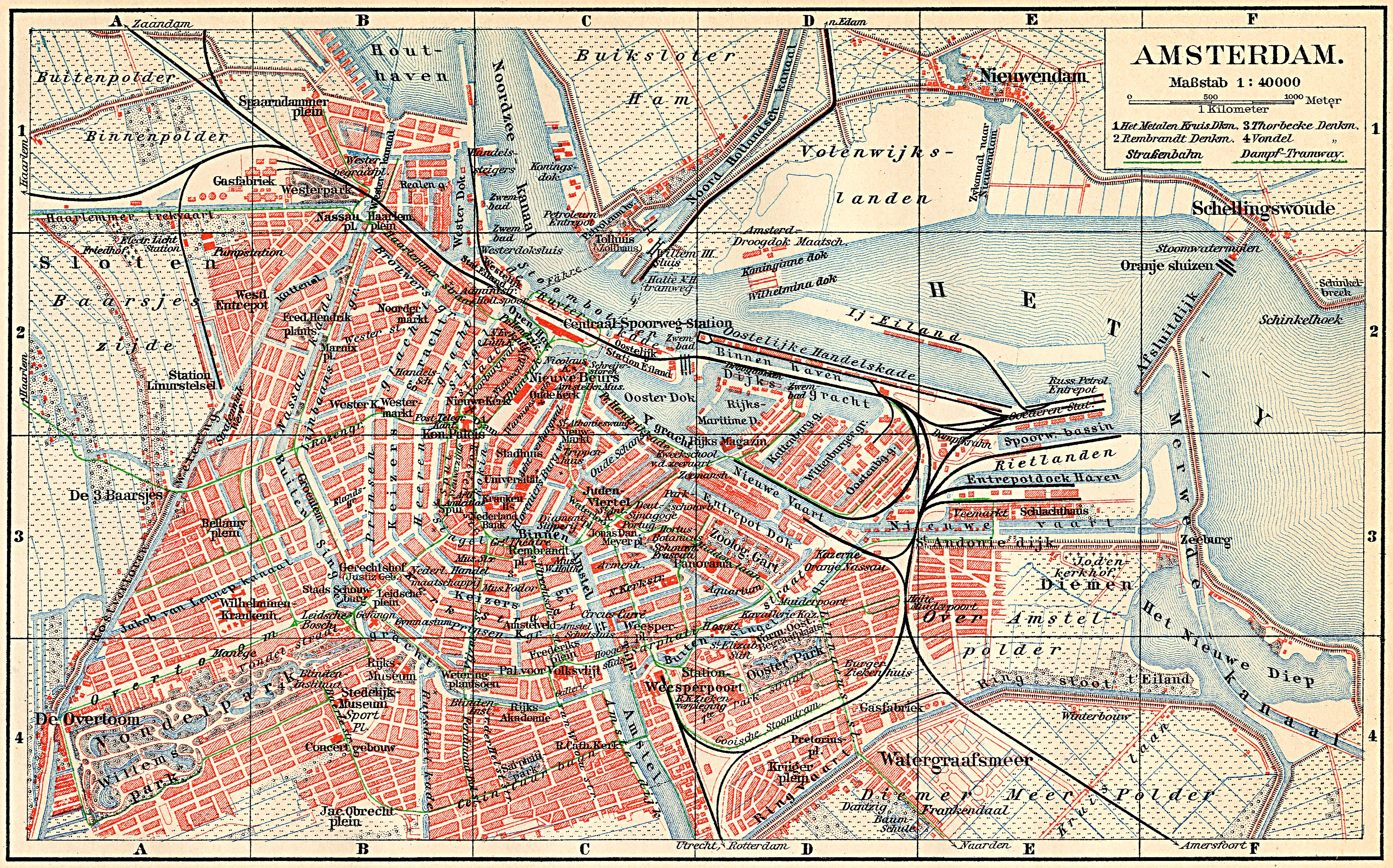
1905 map showing the first three dry docks

1883 and 1884 were good years for ADM, with Koninginnedok being very busy. On 17 October 1884 ADM then bought NMSD, the dry dock company of Von Lindern. In November 1884 ADM asked the municipality of Amsterdam to buy grounds south of Koninginnedok in order to place a second dry dock. ADM raised 300,000 guilders in bonds to pay for Von Lindern. The dry dock of Von Lindern was then renamed Koningsdok.

ADM paid a dividend of 9% over 1884. The next years saw ADM paying 6-7 % dividend a year, climbing to 9% in the early 1890s. In 1894 and 1895 it was 11%. In 1897 the dividend over 1896 was slightly less at 9%. Meanwhile the small competitor Reederij der Drijvende Droogdokken demolished its Amsterdam Wooden Drydock II in the Westerdok in 1890, and went downhill till it sold its remaining dry docks in 1902.

=== High profits and bigger dry docks (1897–1914) ===
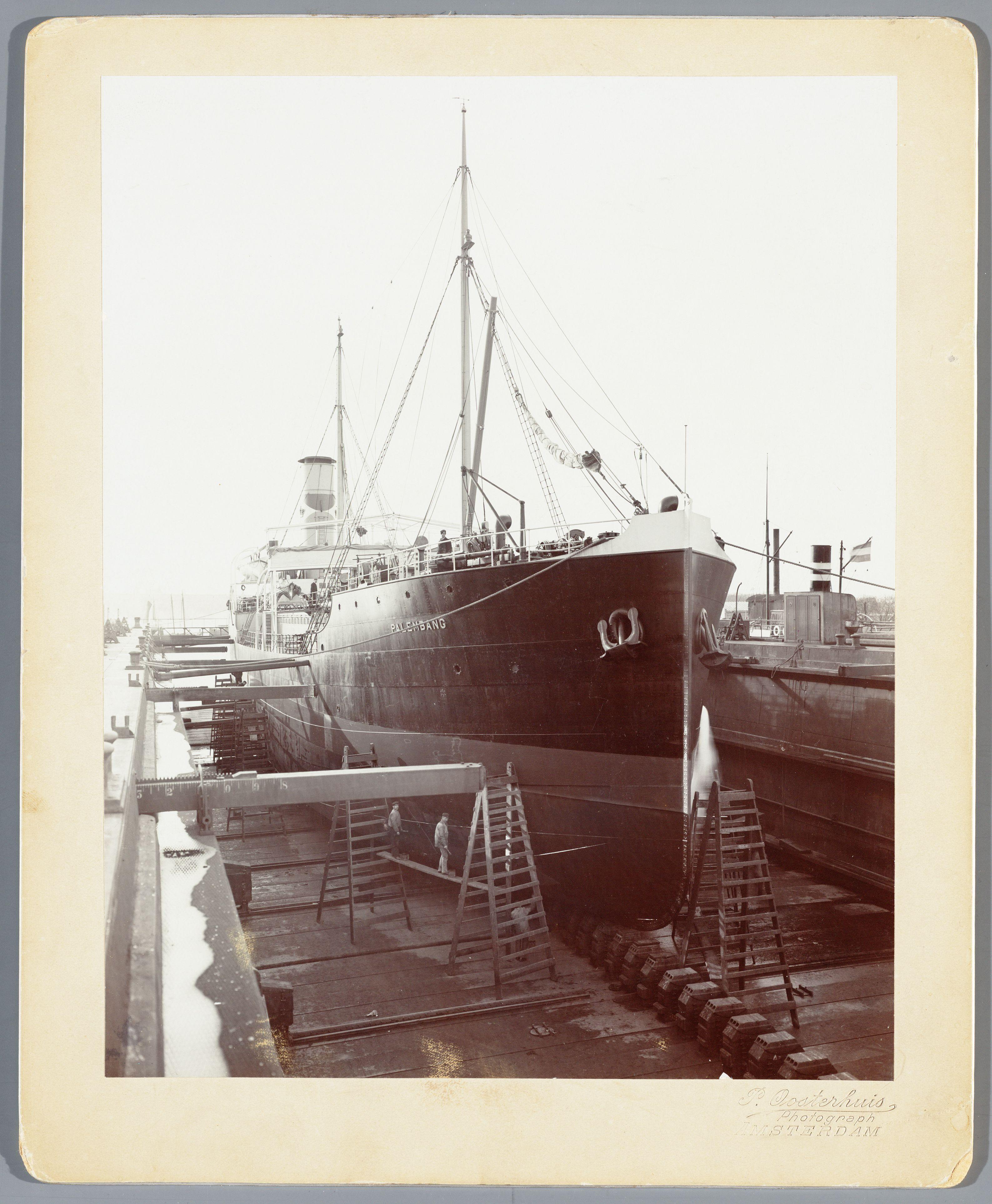
Tanker Palembang in 1905

In December 1896 the Great Lock of IJmuiden (then called Grote Sluis, now Middensluis) was opened. It was 225 m long and 25 m wide. The board of ADM was then authorized by the shareholders to raise a loan for a new, larger dry dock. On 7 September ADM raised a loan of 650,000 guilders at 3.5%. Later in September 1897 ADM then ordered her third dry dock at Nederlandsche Scheepsbouw Maatschappij for about 700,000 guilders. It would be 424 feet (129 m) long, and capable of lifting up to 7,500 tons. On 14 May 1899 this dry dock was taken into use as Wilhelmina-dok later written Wilhelminadok.

In the early 20th century dividend remained high. In 1901 the municipality of Amsterdam sold a landward strip of 278.8 mm by 20 m to ADM for 11,152 guilders. In 1902 ADM existed 25 years. It then had 370 permanent staff, and regularly employed about 200 others. The company continued to pay high dividends, and so the share price was at 160% in 1907. In February 1909, Koningsdok was moved from its old location to a new harbor that had been dug north of Koninginnedok.

In January 1910 an extraordinary meeting of shareholders authorized the board of ADM to emit bonds for up to 700,000 guilders. Part of this money should be used to order yet another floating dry dock, the later Juliana Drydock. These bonds were indeed offered in March 1910. In 1911 there was a general repositioning of the ADM dry docks. Koningsdok and Koninginnedok were moored next to each other in a kind of harbor. Wilhelmina Drydock took the place of Koninginnedok, and the fourth dock (Juliana Drydock) would take the place of Wilhelminadok. On 12 May 1911 Julianadok was launched by NSM. It was 139 m long, and could lift ships of 12,000 tons. It was self-docking, consisting of three parts which could be disconnected to dock each other. Already in 1912 ADM made a plan to lengthen Julianadok by buying a fourth section. This would lengthen her to 615 feet (187.5 m), and increase her capacity to 16,000 tons. This option had been thought of in the design, and was used because several shipping lines had announced longer ships.

In late 1912 ADM had four dry docks, a terrain of 80,000 m^{2}, and workshops of 11,000 m^{2}. Just like Juliandok was to be lengthened, the terrains and workshops would also be expanded. Nevertheless, there were still only 400 shares in ADM, and its open bonds amounted to 860,000 guilders. Therefore ADM offered 200 new shares at 150% on 6 January 1913. Of course with preference for the existing shareholders, at one share for each two a shareholder had. As could be expected, most shareholders used their right of preference, and so there were only a few new shareholders. In January 1913 construction of a boiler factory (Ketelmakerij) started. In July 1913 ADM bought the last 7,300 m^{2} of open terrain available to expand the shipyard, east of the Valkenweg. This ground would allow ADM to build a 'harbor', and to moor Wilhelminadok there. Julianadok would then be the only dry dock moored on the IJ.

=== World War I ===
World War I was a very good time for the Dutch shipping industry, but this applied especially to shipbuilding. For ADM the first years seemed little different from before the war. However, ADM was not immune to the downturn in the second half of the war.

Year	Ships docked	Tons	Dividend
1912	546	895,054	12%
1913	592	1,067,900	12%
1914	570	1,165,267	10%
1915	603	1,272,662	12%
1916	558	833,503	12%
1917	351	406,469	6%
1918	314	246,512	6%
1919	434	811,923	15%
1920	466	993,654	15%

=== Interwar period ===
At the start of the interwar period, Dutch industry was in a good position. By 1920 ADM was reserving money to build a fifth dry dock, which was ordered at NSM on 1 August 1921. This dry dock would be named Prins Hendrikdok, was 650 by 130 by 56 feet, and would have a lift capacity of 25,000 tons. The boiler factory was also expanded, and a factory for sheet metal and metal frames was built. The depression of 1920–1921 hit the Dutch industry somewhat later, but in 1922 ADM fired all loose laborers, and cut wages by 6%.

When the new dry dock was taken into use in January 1925, ADM asked for a new terrain. This would be a lease of 116,500 m^{2} on the Zijkanaal naar Nieuwendam (see 1905 map). The terrain would be used for the new dock and related activities. Meanwhile business was not good, and ADM twice cut wages by 5% in 1925 There was also no dividend over 1925, for the first time in 48 years. When RDM in Rotterdam had been working overtime, and did pay dividend, there were some questions.

In 1926–1929 results were better, even though the dry docks were not always occupied. In 1928 part of Koningsdok was sent to Wieringen to serve there. In 1929 utilization was better, but prices for repair continued to be low. When the Great Depression started in 1929, affairs became worse. Over 1930, 1931 and 1932 there was no dividend. In December 1932 there was a notable job for ADM, when Prins Hendrikdok lifted the wreck of MS Pieter Corneliszoon Hooft in order to close all leaks.

In 1933 the situation became very worrying. Only 237 ships of 629,974 tons visited the dry docks, and the company made a loss before depreciation. This was repeated in 1934 and 1935. After the guilder had been devaluated, ADM made an operational profit in 1936, but this was all used for depreciation. Over 1937 ADM resumed dividend at 10%. In June 1938 ADM then offered 600 shares of 1,000 guilders at 117.5% to the regular shareholders. In August 1938 ADM sold Julianadok to a company from the Free City of Danzig, whence it was quickly towed. The idea was that this gave additional funds to modernize the other docks, especially Prins Hendrikdok. Profitable years were 1938 and 1939, but a lot of profit had to be used for depreciations which had not taken place earlier.

=== World War II ===
Despite the German occupation of the Netherlands in May 1940, the first year of the war were almost business as usual for ADM. In 1940, 1941, 1942 and 1943 ADM made regular profits, and paid nice dividends. After D-Day things changed. In September 1944 the cranes and dry docks of ADM were destroyed. Later, it proved that several dry docks were relatively undamaged, but Prins Hendrikdok had been utterly ruined by blowing it up with a ship inside. Furthermore, almost all onshore facilities of ADM were heavily damaged.

=== Post World War II ===
The first years after World War II saw a lot of attention to resurfacing and repairing Prins Hendrikdok. Nevertheless ADM was already profitable again in 1947. In 1950 the repaired Prins Hendrikdok was almost continuously occupied, and so ADM returned to paying high dividends. By 1953 the bonanza was over, but the shipping industry was still doing good business.

From 1950 till 1965 ADM also built new ships. Because ADM did not have slipways, this was done by building sections. These were assembled in dry dock 2, and then launched by lowering the dry dock. From the fact that this was done in dry dock 2, one can deduce that this pertained to relatively small ships. However, working on new ships when demand for repairs was low, was a very effective way to operate a repair shipyard.

=== Westhaven ===
In 1958 ADM announced it would construct a second 'shipyard' at a new location in Amsterdam West, called Westhaven. ADM would ask investors for 2,9 million guilders to build it. Construction of the buildings officially started on 23 August 1961. The terrain of 42 hectares was be like a private harbor / dock of 9.5 m depth. A large factory and office were built for 400 employees. A 155 m long pier with two 15t cranes would be used for ships that did not have to be lifted out of the water.

For this Werf Westhaven (Western Harbor Shipyard) a new dry dock 5 was built by ADM itself. This would be 189 m long and 27.40 m wide. The lift capacity would be 18,000 ton, enabling it to lift freighters and tankers of about 25,000 dwt.

Westhaven was officially opened on 23 March 1965. The old shipyard was then renamed Werf Noord (northern shipyard). Werf Westhaven was completed in 1965.

=== Last profitable years (1963–1974) ===
In 1963 the downturn in ADM's business became palpable. In 1964 the construction of new ships led to serious losses, and so shipbuilding was stopped. In 1965 the repair business was profitable, but the labor cost per hour in 1965 was double that of 1960. Turnover in non-shipping business grew from 2% in 1964 to 10% in 1965. Profit grew again in 1966. In 1967 business was again good, but productivity did not grow fast enough in respect to increased wages, and so profits decreased. In 1968 and 1969 the generally positive situation in ship repairs continued. In 1970 ADM had a very good year with a 20% increase in turnover. 1971 saw another 25% increase in turnover. In 1972 ADM still had a small profit of 765,000 guilders. In 1973 there was a loss of 324,000 guilders. In 1974 there was again a profit of 2.2 million guilders.

=== To Ruin (1975–1978) ===
In 1975 there was a sudden catastrophic operational loss of 6.5 million guilders. In 1976 there was again a profit, but also a reorganization plan of 3 million. In 1977 there was another big loss of 9.9 million guilders. That year, staff decreased from 1,337 to 984.

As part of the reorganization, ADM decided to concentrate its activities on its first location. It led to the closure of the Westhaven facilities. This indeed led to diminishing losses. In fall 1978, the board of ADM expected to finish the year without further losses.

== Amsterdamse Droogdok Maatschappij BV and ADM Beheer (1978) ==
=== Forced merger with NDSM ===
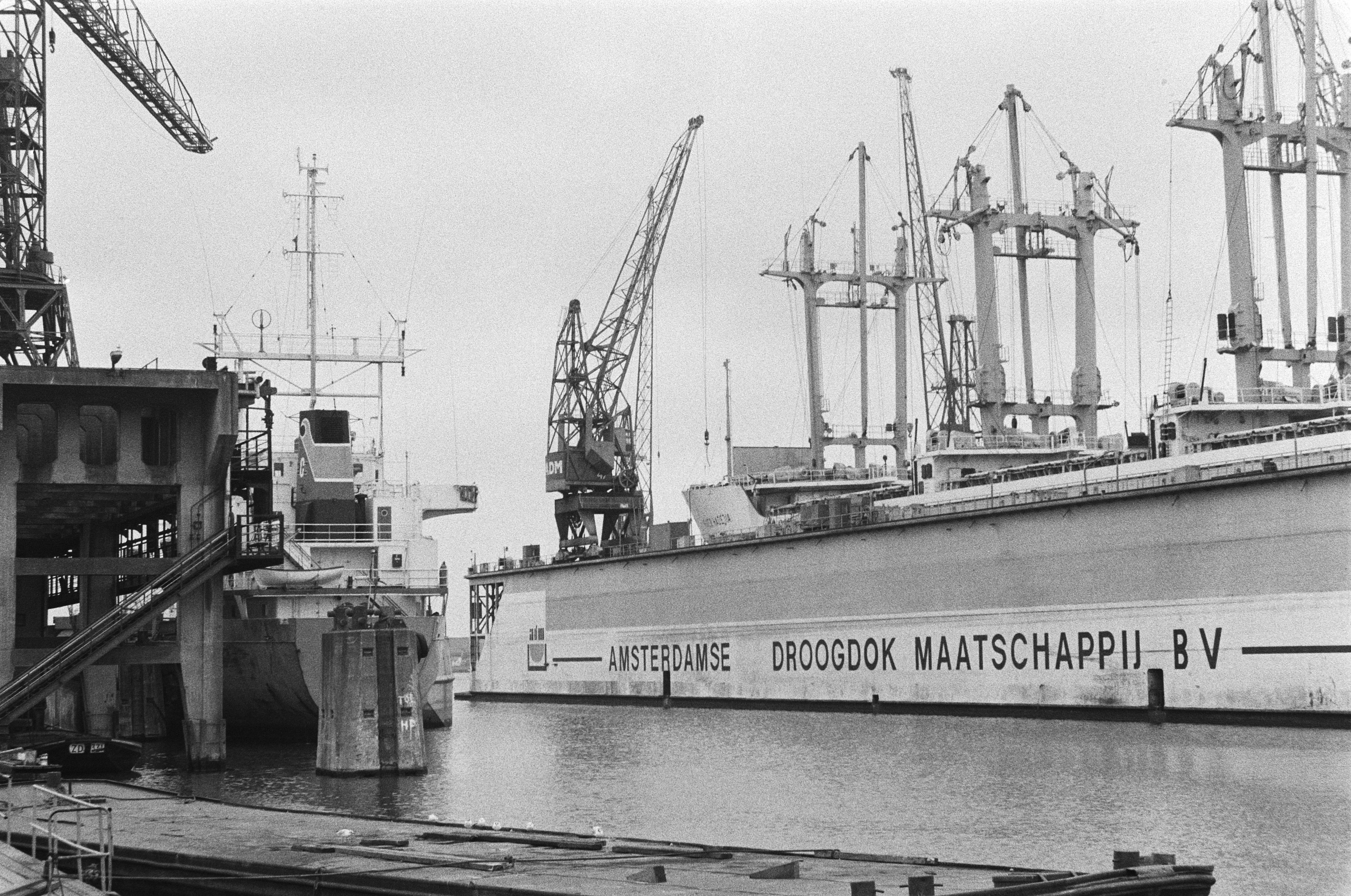
A dry dock of ADM BV

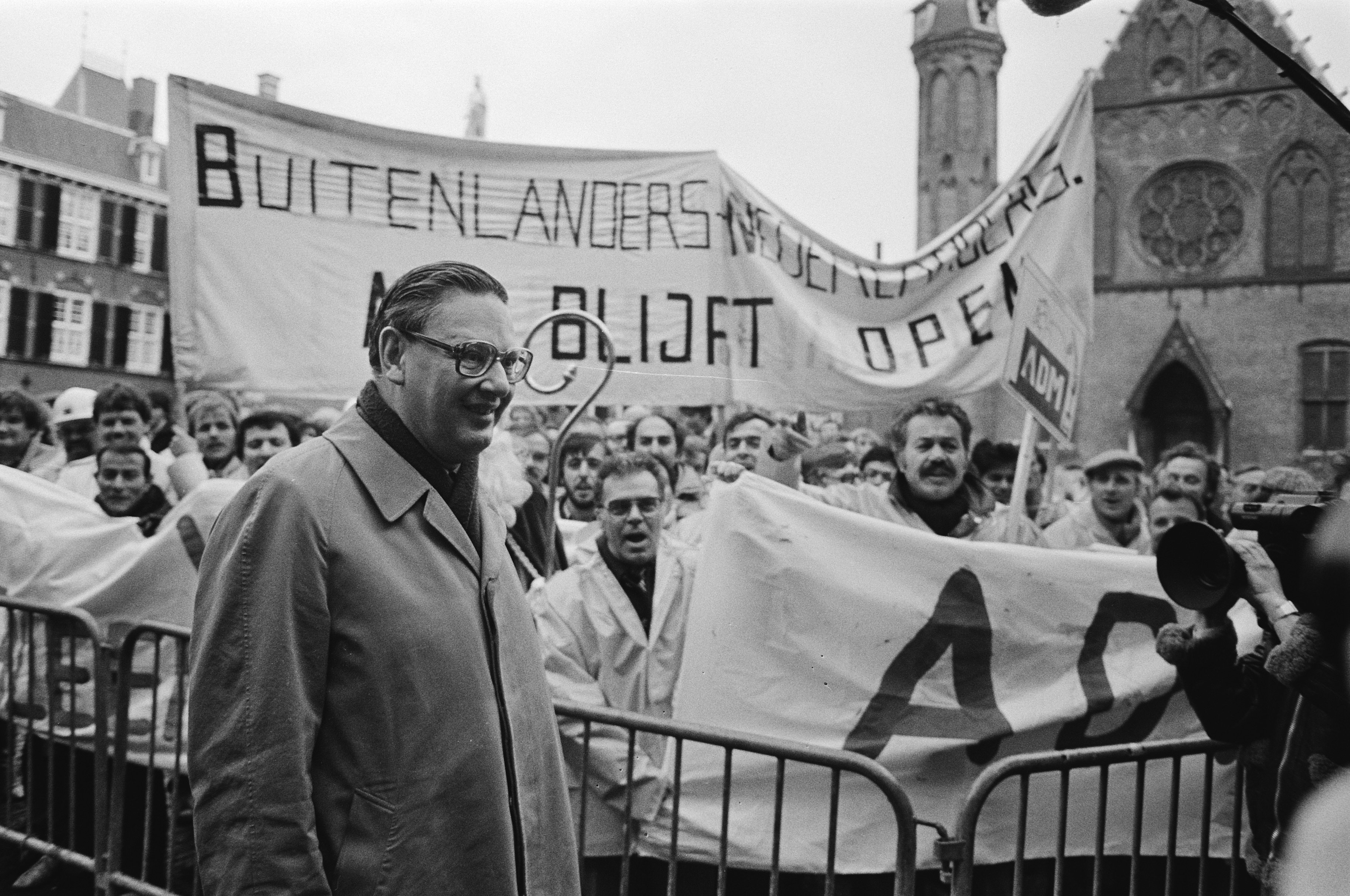
ADM employees protest against possible closure, 1982

In early 1978 the other major Amsterdam shipyard NDSM of 3,000 employees was in very serious trouble. The government and Rijn-Schelde-Verolme, the very large shipyard and holding which owned NDSM then thought of a plan to merge the repair activities of NDSM and ADM in a new company. ADM had already reorganized, and did not like this idea for merger with a weaker partner. By March 1978, the merger of the repair activities of both companies, and the end of shipbuilding at NDSM was government policy. The board of ADM had not been consulted about the merger idea. Worse, it had not even received an official message.

When ADM was consulted, a plan to create a new company on the grounds of NDSM was made. ADM demanded that all her staff would be employed by the new company, that the terrains owned by ADM would not become part of the new company, and that the government paid an unspecified subsidy. On 27 September 1978 there was a final agreement to merge the repair activities in a new company ADM BV under direction of ADM. The government participated for 14 million, and gave 25 million to cover initial losses. A small shipyard for shipbuilding (Nederlandse Scheepsbouw Maatschappij BV) was also set up, and would also be managed by ADM.

=== Amsterdamse Droogdok Maatschappij BV (1978–1985) ===
On 24 October 1978, the shareholders of ADM NV agreed to found a new Amsterdamse Droogdok Maatschappij BV. In the name of the new company, 'Amsterdamse' was spelled without 'ch'. The 'BV' for Besloten vennootschap marked it as a company that was not publicly traded.

In the new ADM BV, ADM NV got a share of 53% against the Dutch government's 47% share. The new company would operate on the terrain of the NDSM at the Klaprozenweg. All employees of ADM would be taken over by ADM BV with guarantees by ADM NV. The activities of the Nederlandse Scheepsbouw Maatschappij BV, would not hinder ADM BV.

ADM BV would get six dry docks. Four were old graving docks of the NDSM. The two others were floating docks 'Dok 5' of 18,000t and 'Dok 6'. On 28 December 1979, Dok 5 was towed from the Meeuwenlaan to the Klaprozenweg. By early 1980 ADM BV was a very modern repair shipyard that would officially be opened in September 1980.

From the start, ADM BV had enough work, but operated at a loss. Over 1979, ADM BV's operating loss was 20.4 million guilders. As the government had given 25 million to merge and move the company, the future of ADM BV depended on whether this loss was really caused by expenses to move and integrate the company. In early 1980, ADM NV warned that in the contemporary circumstances a break-even or slightly profitable result was only possible for a company with suitable ratios. In particular a suitable composition of the workforce. ADM Beheer had made a correct assessment. Over 1980, ADM BV lost 26 million guilders.

For 1981, Minister Gijs van Aardenne said in late 1980 that he was prepared to put another 30 million into ADM BV on condition that ADM Beheer would put in 5 million. The shareholders and supervisory board of ADM Beheer objected to this idea. In the first four months of 1981, ADM BV continued to lose two million guilders a month. On 12 May 1981 ADM BV then filed for a rather unique preliminary injunction against ADM Beheer to pay 5 million. By then the government had already paid 10 million. The chairman of the supervisory board mr. H.G. Heuzeveldt said in defense that it made no sense to put in 5 million, because it would simply be spent on paying debts. With an about equal number of employees, ADM BV suffered a loss of 14.8 million over 1981.

In 1982, the government continued to subsidize ADM BV. One of the conditions for this was that ADM Beheer sold shares of a nominal of 5 million for one guilder to a foundation under government control. This reduced ADM Beheer's share in ADM BV from 53% to 34%.

The core of ADM BV's problem was that it spent too much on employees in relation to what it produced. It had way too many employees in jobs that were not directly related to ship repair, the so-called indirects. Among the employees that did repair ships, too many were ill or idle. In late 1982, a report suggested to reduce the number of direct jobs from 1,080 to 650 (-40%) and the indirect jobs from 520 to 250 (-52%).

By early 1985 the situation was desperate. On 4 January 1985 ADM asked for an automatic stay, on 17 January ADM BV filed for bankruptcy.

=== ADM Beheer ===
In early 1979, ADM NV changed its name to ADM Beheer ('ADM holding'). The grounds of ADM remained with ADM NV. The whole led to the share price of ADM shares increasing from 115 guilders in early 1979 to 200 guilders in November. This was equal to a price of 35 guilders per square meter of ground owned by ADM Beheer.

By early 1980, ADM Beheer was doing well because of the grounds it owned. Its part in ADM BV was valued at 16 million guilders, but it expected that it would have to be depreciated soon. On 1 May 1980, ADM Beheer received 15 million for the sale of the terrains on the Meeuwenlaan where ADM had been founded. This resulted in a profit of 6 million. After selling the Meeuwenlaan to the Amsterdam municipality, ADM Beheer still had: the 53% share in ADM BV, a dozen houses, two floating dry docks, and the 45 hectares terrain at Westhaven.

== Aftermath (1985–2025) ==
=== ADM Naval Services (ANS) (1985–1988) ===
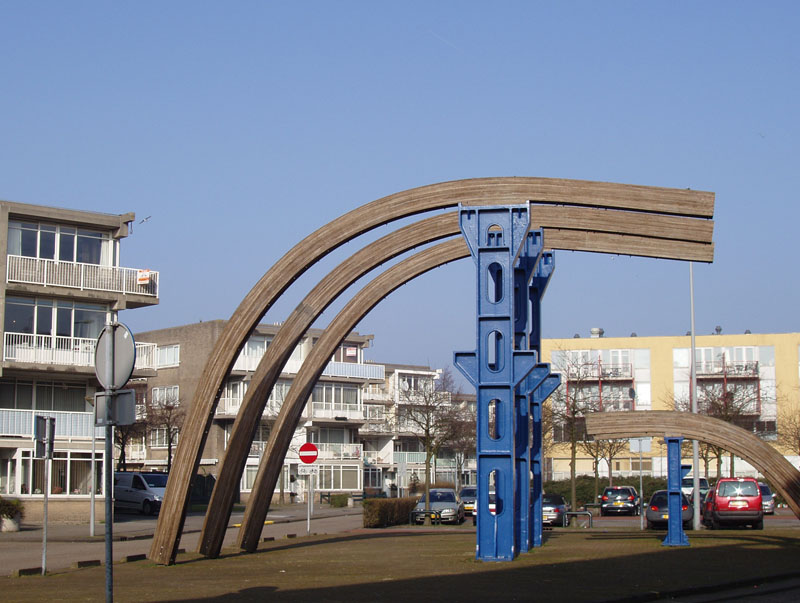
ADM Monument at first location

After bankruptcy had been declared, a small company called ADM Naval Services (ANS) was founded. It had the specific purpose of modernizing the old cruiser Almirante Grau of the Peruvian navy. About 150 former employees worked for this company till this project was finished. Meanwhile plans to restart ADM BV came to nothing. In November 1986 the inventory of ADM was auctioned. On 22 January 1988 Almirante Grau left for Peru after work had been finished.

=== Squatters Community Westhaven ===
The former shipyard Westhaven was squatted in 1987, and cleared in 1992. In 1997 the terrain was sold to Bertus Lüske, and squatted again. Now squatters realized a kind of community like Freetown Christiania in Copenhagen. In July 2018 the Council of State judged the presence of the squatters illegal, and the last of them was evicted by force in January 2019.

On 24 September 2025 it was reported that the municipality of Amsterdam had bought the terrain of the former ADM shipyard for 165 million euro.
