= Koninginnedok =

Former floating dry dock in Amsterdam, Netherlands

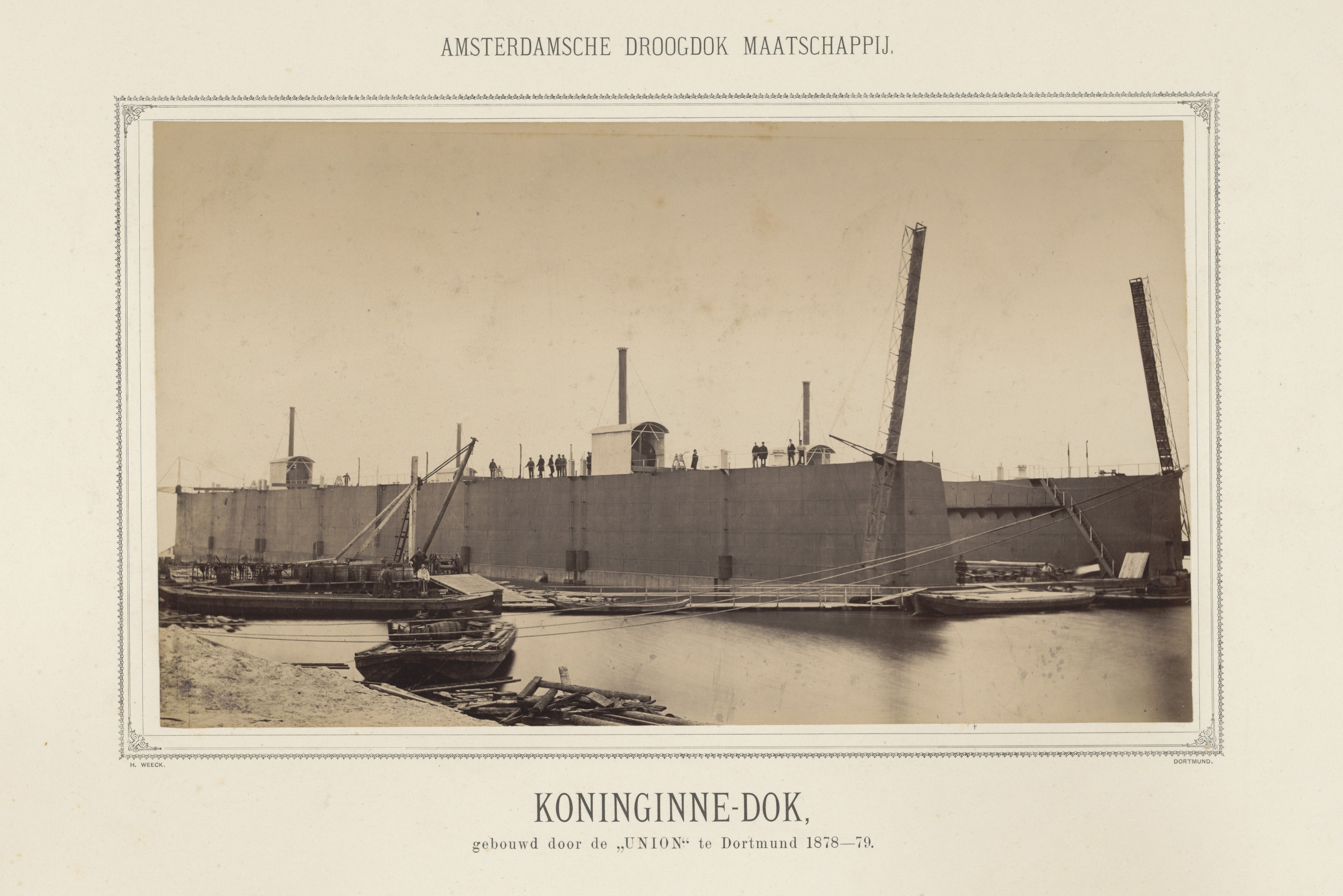
- Koninginnedok around the time of delivery in 1879

History

Netherlands
- Name: Koninginnedok
- Launched: 7 April 1879
- Christened: 25 April 1879
- Out of service: 1980?
- Home port: Amsterdam

General characteristics (as completed)
- Length: 400 ft (121.9 m)
- Beam: 92 ft (28.0 m)
- Draft: (empty); (loading); 7 ft 3 in (2.2 m) (loaded)
- Depth of hold: 30 ft (9.1 m) (side); 7 ft 9 in (2.4 m) (pontoon)

Koninginnedok was the first iron floating dry dock in Amsterdam. It was built to service the ocean liners that came into use in the mid-19th century. The dry dock was important to maintain Amsterdam's position in the oceanic trade. Koninginnedok was a landmark of Amsterdam, clearly visible from the southern bank of the IJ and on city maps. As larger floating docks and ocean liners came into use, Koninginnedok was relegated to serving smaller types of ships. It was moved to a less conspicuous location but nevertheless served for over a century.

== Context ==
The Suez Canal, which opened in 1869, made it economically feasible to operate steam shipping lines to the Dutch East Indies. In 1870, this led to the foundation of the Stoomvaart Maatschappij Nederland (SMN). This company was based in Amsterdam, but its ships could not reach their home port and had to use the outport of Nieuwediep. Meanwhile, the North Sea Canal was constructed from 1865 to 1876. It was expected that as soon as the North Sea Canal would become suitable for ocean liners (this happened in October 1878), the ministry of defense would no longer allow SMN to use its dry docks in Nieuwediep.

In 1846, the first floating dry dock in the city, Amsterdam Wooden Drydock I, had been commissioned. By 1857, it had been followed by three more. These wooden dry docks were too small for SMN's and other ocean liners. They were located in the Oosterdok and Westerdok. This was beneficial as long as the IJ was tidal, but became a competitive disadvantage after the IJ was closed off by the Oranje Locks in 1872.

The situation led to two initiatives to establish new floating dry docks in Amsterdam. The first initiative led to the establishment of the Nederlansche Maatschappij voor Scheepsbouw en Dokken (NMSD) by Messrs. von Lindern. The other initiative was supported by the SMN and led to the foundation of the Amsterdamsche Droogdok Maatschappij (ADM).

== Ordering and construction ==
The order for Koninginnedok was intrinsically linked to the foundation of the Amsterdamsche Droogdok Maatschappij. Potential investors in ADM would want to have some idea of what that dry dock would cost. For this, the founders based their dry dock on the largest ship that could pass the North Sea locks of the canal. These allowed ships of 120 by 18 by 8 m to pass. The founders then had William Pearce manager of John Elder & Co. Shipyard make a design for such a dry dock. The same company had also built the first ocean liners of the SMN.

=== The tender for Koninginnedok ===
On 8 January 1878 ADM tendered the construction of Koninginnedok. It was to be a floating iron dry dock for merchant and navy ships. There was no fixed delivery date. The bidder had to state the time that it would take him to deliver the dry dock. On 9 January 1878, the results of the tender were collected in 'Lokaal het Vosje' in Amsterdam.

Name	Place	Country	Offer	Delivery date
Skerne Ironworks Ltd.	Darlington	United Kingdom	560,000	44 weeks
Union, AG für Bergbau, Eisen- und Stahl-Industrie	Dortmund	Germany	622,563	15 January 1879
Harkort’sche Fabrik	Duisburg	Germany	661,000	30 December 1879
Cockerill	Seraing	Belgium	662,400	11 months
C. Mitchell & Co.	Newcastle	United Kingdom	689,000	31 October 1878
Thomas Wingate & Co	Glasgow	United Kingdom	690,000	12 months
Fijenoord	Rotterdam	Netherlands	725,000	2 years
Ch. Bosch Reitz	Den Helder	Netherlands	725,000*	30 November 1878
De Schelde	Vlissingen	Netherlands	738,000	14 months
Randolph, Elder, & Co	Glasgow	United Kingdom	750,000	31 January 1879
Koninklijke Fabriek van Stoom- en andere Werktuigen	Amsterdam	Netherlands	752,000	12 months
F. Kloos & Zonen Kloos Kinderdijk	Alblasserdam	Netherlands	775,000	24 months
J. and G. Rennie	London	United Kingdom	776,000	31 July 1879
E. Finch & Co	Chepstow	United Kingdom	787,200	30 October 1879
Société J. F. Cail & Cie	Paris	France	805,000	March 1879
Schneider & Co	Le Creusot	France	807,220	16 months
William Simons & Co.	Renfrew	United Kingdom	820,000	24 months
AG Vulcan Stettin	Stettin	Germany	1,150,000	1 January 1880
* Excl. import duties

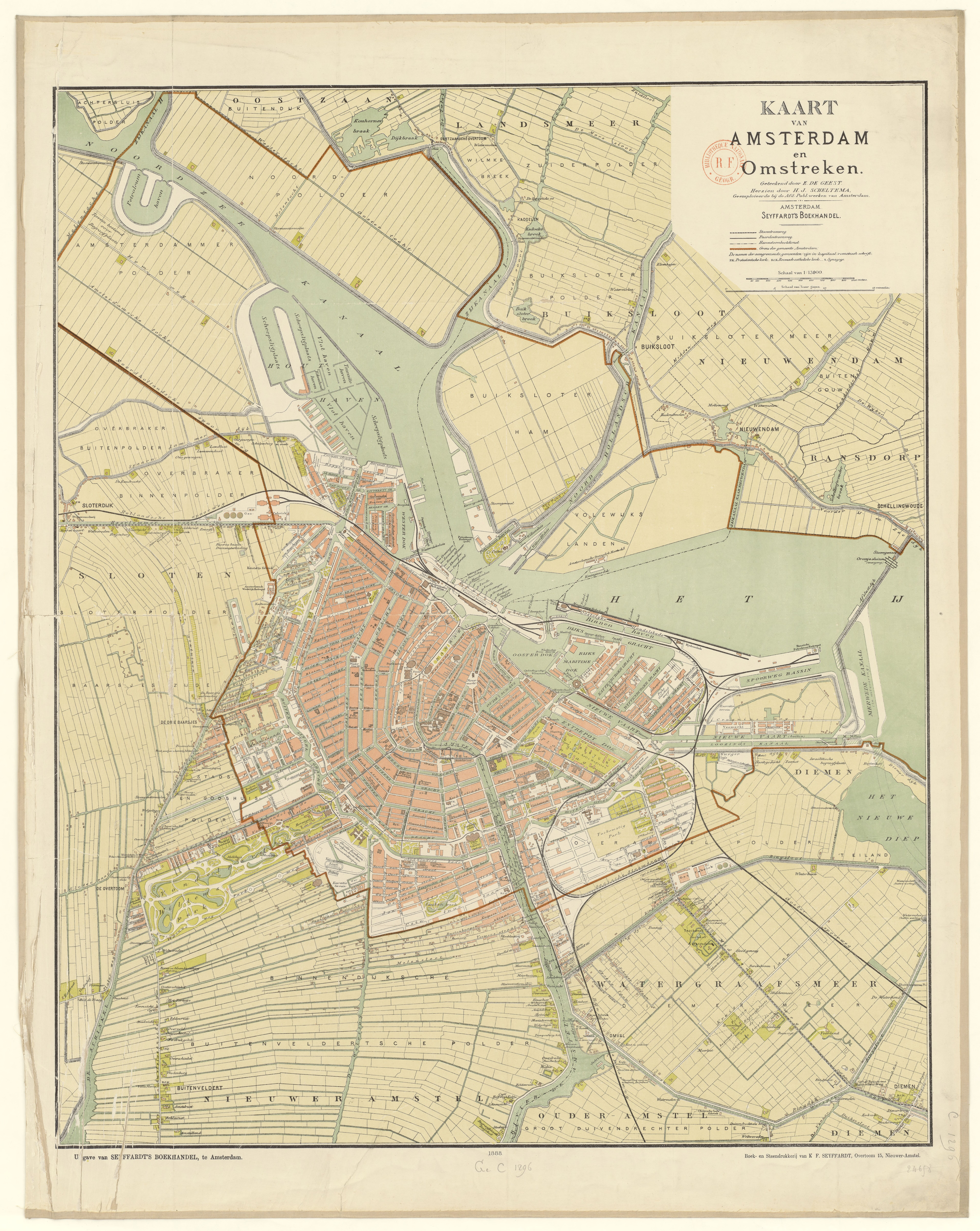
1888 Map with 2 ADM and 4 older wooden dry docks

At first, the order seemed to go to C. Mitchell & Co., but in the end it went to Union A.G. from Dortmund. The management of ADM explained that even though Skerne Ironworks had made the lowest offer, it had not been selected because it had never made a dry dock in the Netherlands. ADM therefore feared that Skerne had miscalculated, especially with regard to the time of delivery. For ADM, this date was so important that it rather paid a bit more to have more certainty. The concerns of the ADM management were justified. The Skerne Ironworks were in bad shape and would close down a second time in May 1879.

=== Construction ===
Union A.G. assembled the dry dock on site. In May 1878, it started to make a construction site on the grounds of the ADM. Most of the work on the dock would be done by Union's own employees, brought from Germany. These were about 250 strong and lived in a temporary wooden village. A visitor noted that it had excellent accommodation and food. Every day barges brought iron parts to the site. Small boats brought all kinds of other supplies.

In July 1878, the first three pontoons for the bottom of the dock stood on temporary slipways, while a fourth slipway was under construction. Each pontoon would require about 75,000 rivets. In August 1878, four pontoons were under construction. The first pontoon was launched on 31 August, and another one was immediately started on the free slipway. The last pontoon was launched on 20 November. On 7 April 1879 the sides had been placed on each part of the dry dock and the two parts of the dry dock were moved to the location where it would begin service.

== Characteristics ==
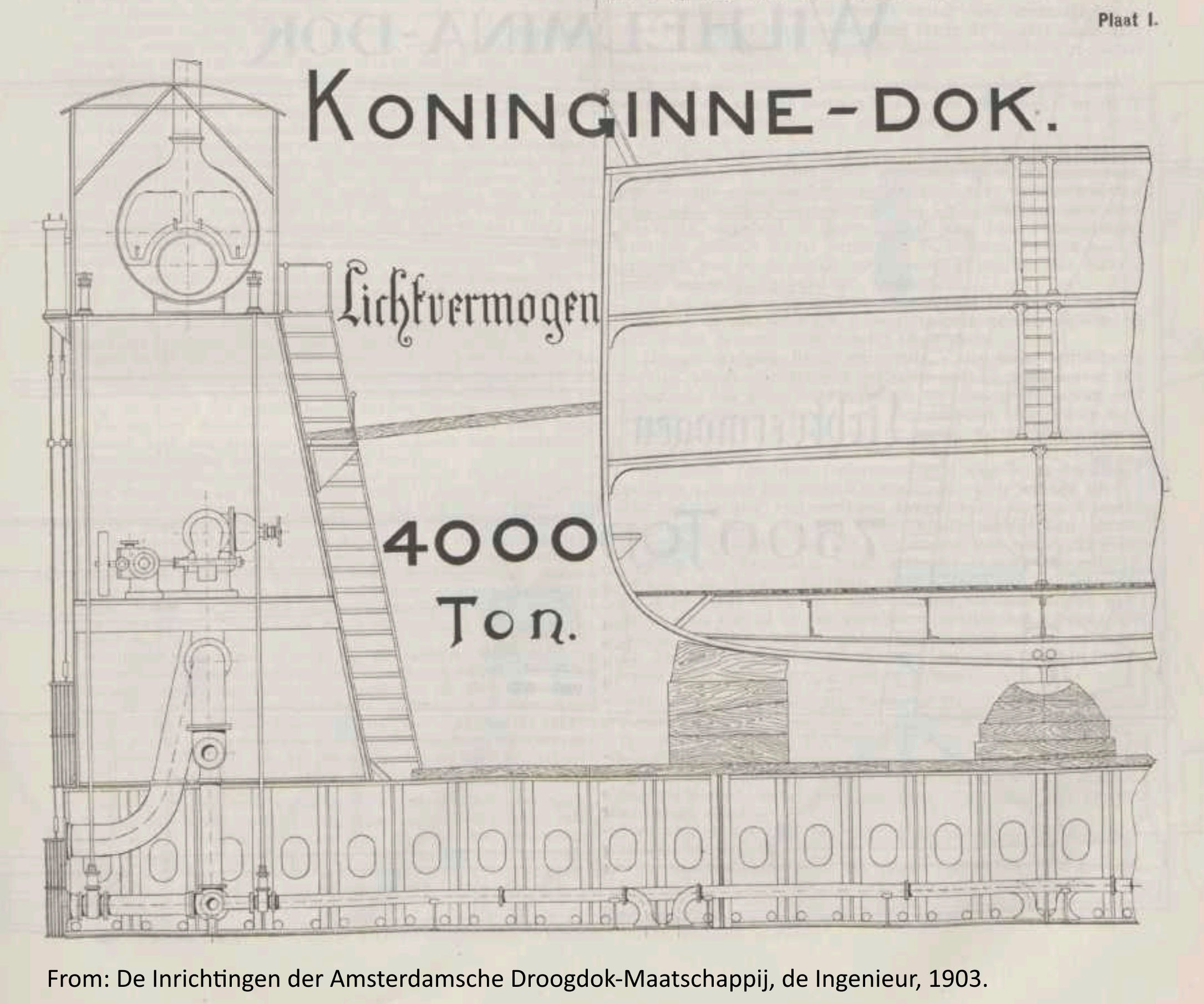
Profile of Koninginnedok

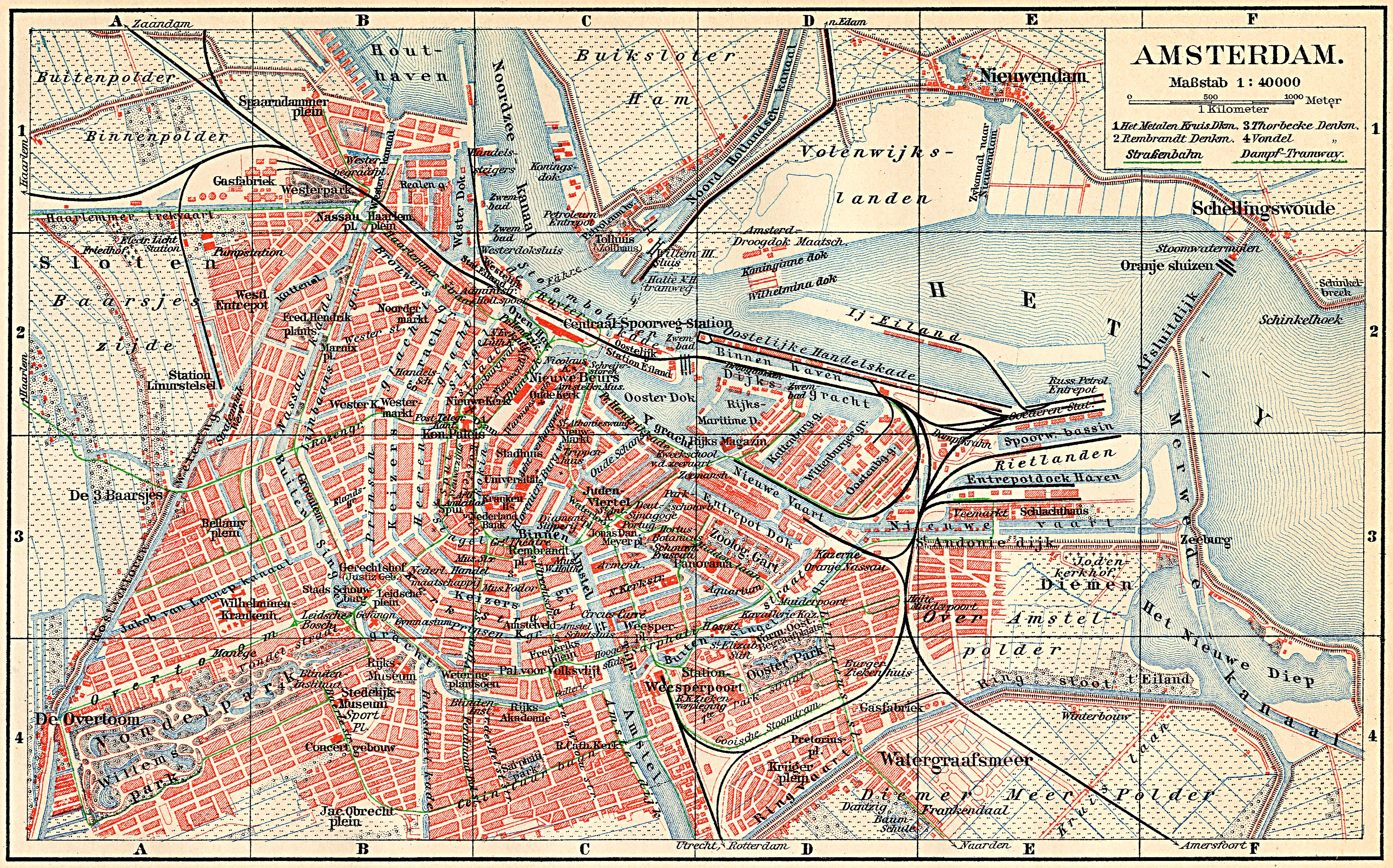
1905 map with ADM's three dry docks.

The design of Koninginnedok used English measures. It was to be 400 ft (121.9 m) long. The width between the sides was to be 71 ft (21.6 m) at the top and 63 ft (19.2 m) on the pontoon. Height was to be 30 ft (9.1 m) The lifting capacity had to be 4,000 tons with a center draft of 7 ft 3 in (2.2 m).

The basement of the dry dock would consist of two parts. Each would consist of four pontoons with a 'length' of 49 ft (14.9 m), a breadth of 92 ft (28.0 m), and a depth of hold of 7 ft 9 in (2.4 m). There would be a space of 10 in (0.3 m) between the pontoons. Each pontoon was divided into three compartments.

Each part was connected by two sides that were 198 ft (60.4 m) long. These were 10 ft (3.0 m) wide at the top and 14 ft (4.3 m) at the pontoon level. Each side consisted of four compartments and had a horizontal bulkhead that made an air chamber that would keep the dock afloat with the sides sticking out 2 ft 9 in (0.8 m) above the water.

The parts could be put together by a connection between the sides and form a single large dry dock. It was also possible to use the parts as two small dry docks.

The pumping machinery of the dry dock would consist of four high pressure steam engines and boilers and four centrifugal pumps. Each side of the two parts would have a boiler and engine. (The boilers are shown below the small houses on top of the sides on both the 1878–79 photos.) The pumps of either the Gwynne or Appold system, had to be able to lift the dock from its greatest draft within two hours.

On the inside of the sides, there would be a 6 ft 3 in (1.9 m) wide walkway at about two-thirds of the height of the sides. On each of the four sides, this would also contain two shores that could be lowered by winches and put against the sides of a docking ship to keep it upright. At the 'bow' and 'stern' of the complete dock, there would be a light iron bridge to connect the upper parts of the sides.

The first location where Koninginnedok would serve was next to ADM's repair shipyard, see 1905 map. The site had been dredged to a depth of 10 m. At each corner, and in the center, three anchors of 4,000 kg kept it in place.

== Service ==
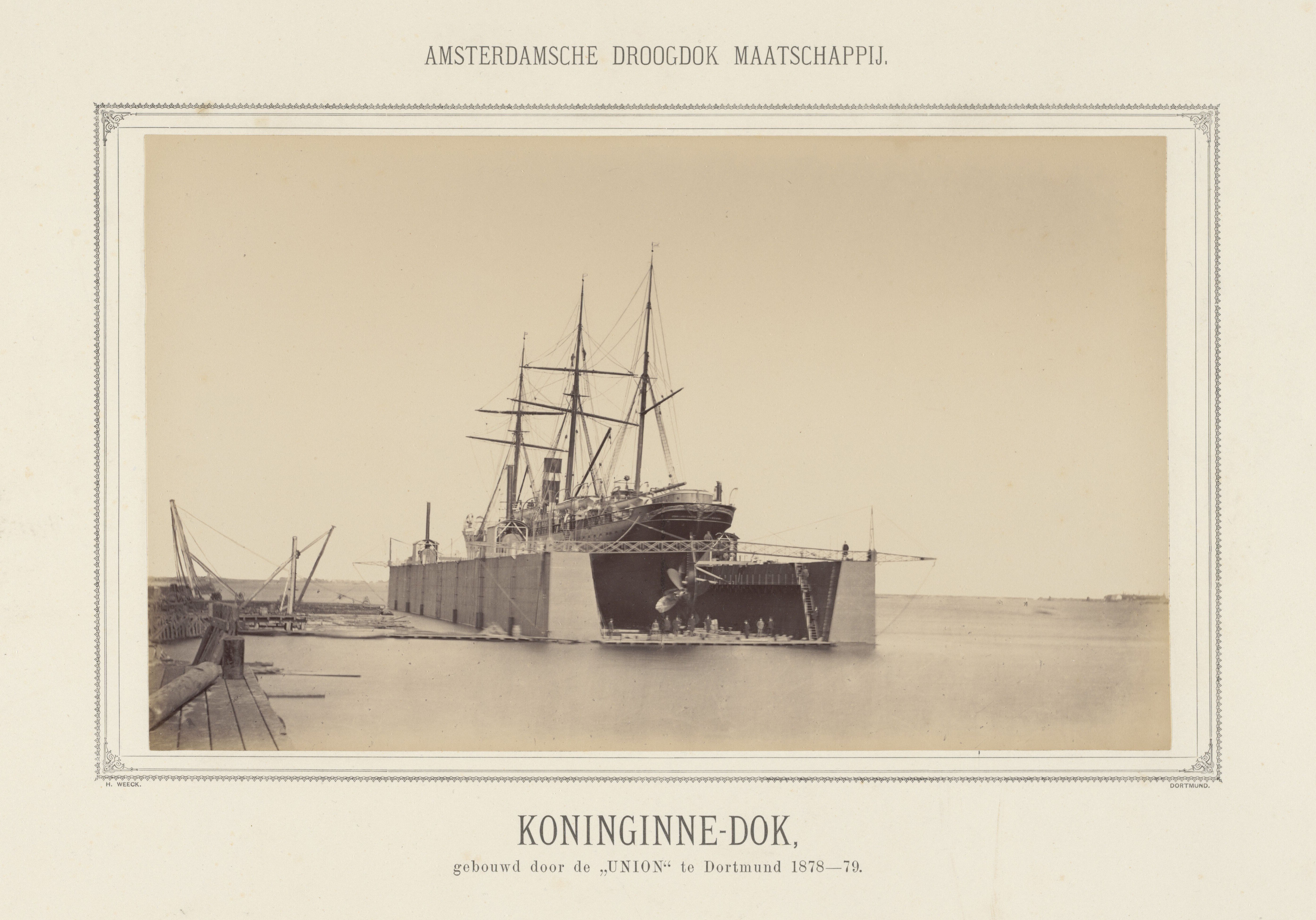
Ocean liner Stad Amsterdam on the dock, 1879

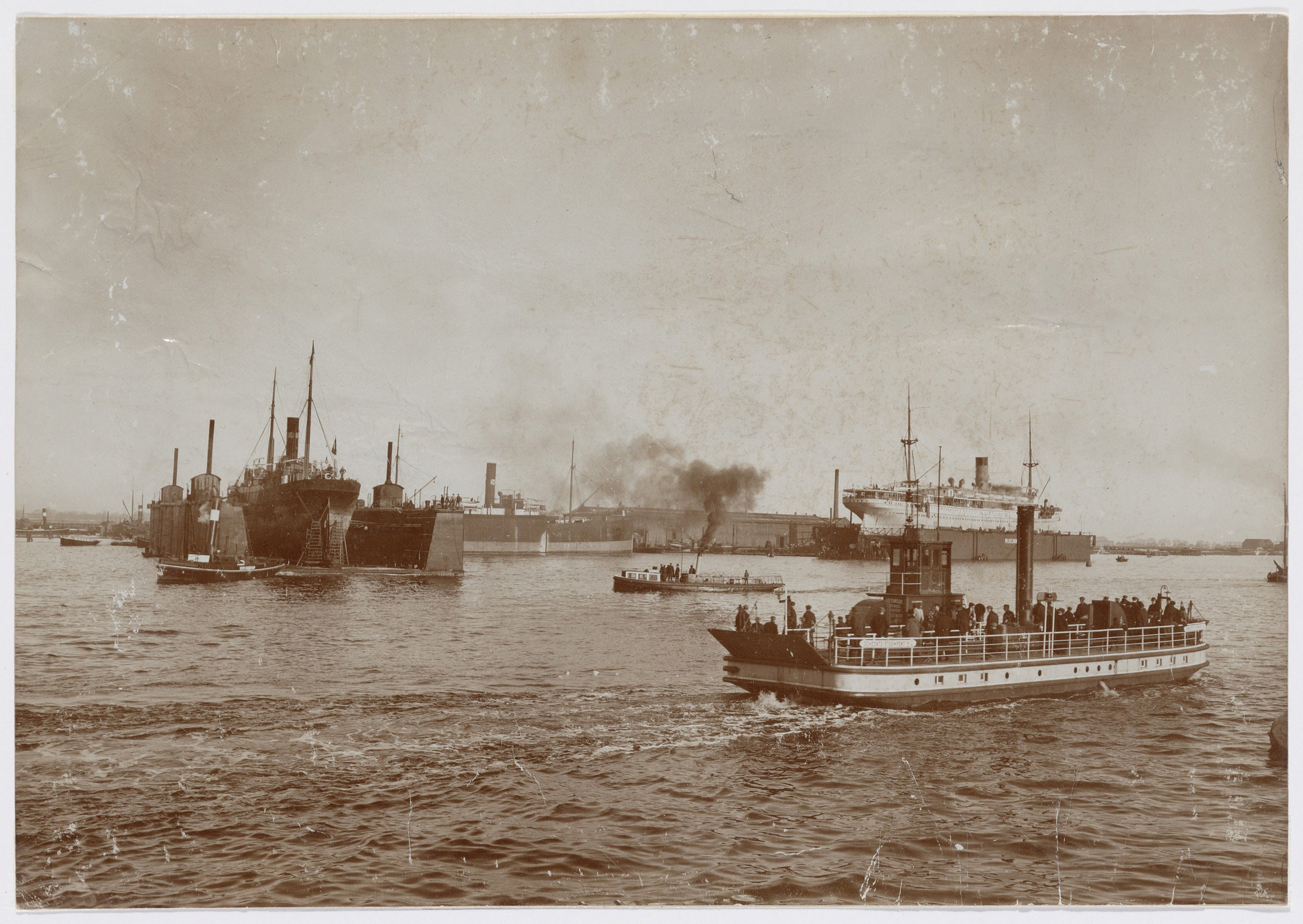
1911: Koninginnedok is moved

On 25 April 1879, King William III and Queen Emma visited Amsterdam. On the occasion, the queen christened the dry dock Koninginne Dok. As people got accustomed to the name, they began to write it as one word 'Koninginnedok'.

On 28 April 1879 the test of the new dry dock failed. An attempt was made to lift SMN's new steamer Prinses Marie of 3800 ton. Of course she did not have to dock, because she had arrived straight from the shipyard. When she had been partially lifted, one of the Gwynnes pumps malfunctioned. The dock was then lowered to let the new steamer out again.

Therefore another test was required. On 6 May 1879, Stad Amsterdam of 360 feet and 3,319 ton, i.e. 3,330,900 kg was lifted successfully. She would be followed by Thorbecke II. The rest of the year, Koninginnedok served 38 ships for 115 days. In 1880 Koninginnedok 86 ships totalling 113,511t for 249 days. In 1881, Koninginnedok served 55 steamships of 103,573t, 7 sailing ships op 7,264t, and 29 steamboats for inland navigation totalling 2,526t. The dock was occupied for 312 days. In 1883 Koninginnedok served 138 ships totalling 185,060t for 355 days. In 1884, this was 140 ships of 187,303t for 347 days.

By 1885, Koninginnedok was only one of the two dry docks of ADM, as in October 1884 ADM had acquired its competitor NMSD. ADM then renamed the acquired dry dock Koningsdok.

On 17 August 1888, Koninginnedok serviced a ship that was longer than the lock chamber of the North Sea Canal lock. This was possible if all lock doors were opened when the sea was as high as the canal level. On 6 August, the French four-mast SS Paris arrived in IJmuiden from Saigon. She was longer than any Dutch steamship and while she was serviced by Koninginnedok she stuck out some feet. The Paris was identified as a ship of 378 feet long. This would make her the Paris, built at La Seyne by Société Nouvelle des Forges et Chantiers de la Méditerranée in 1882. She was managed by the Compagnie Commerciale de Transports à vapeur Français.

In May 1899, Koninginnedok became less important, as AMD took the new larger Wilhelmina Drydock into use. This was almost 130 m long, and could lift 7,500ton. It had everything to do with the opening of a new larger lock in the North Sea Canal in December 1896. Wilhelminadok got a place next to Koninginnedok on its southeast side.

=== Moved to a dock ===
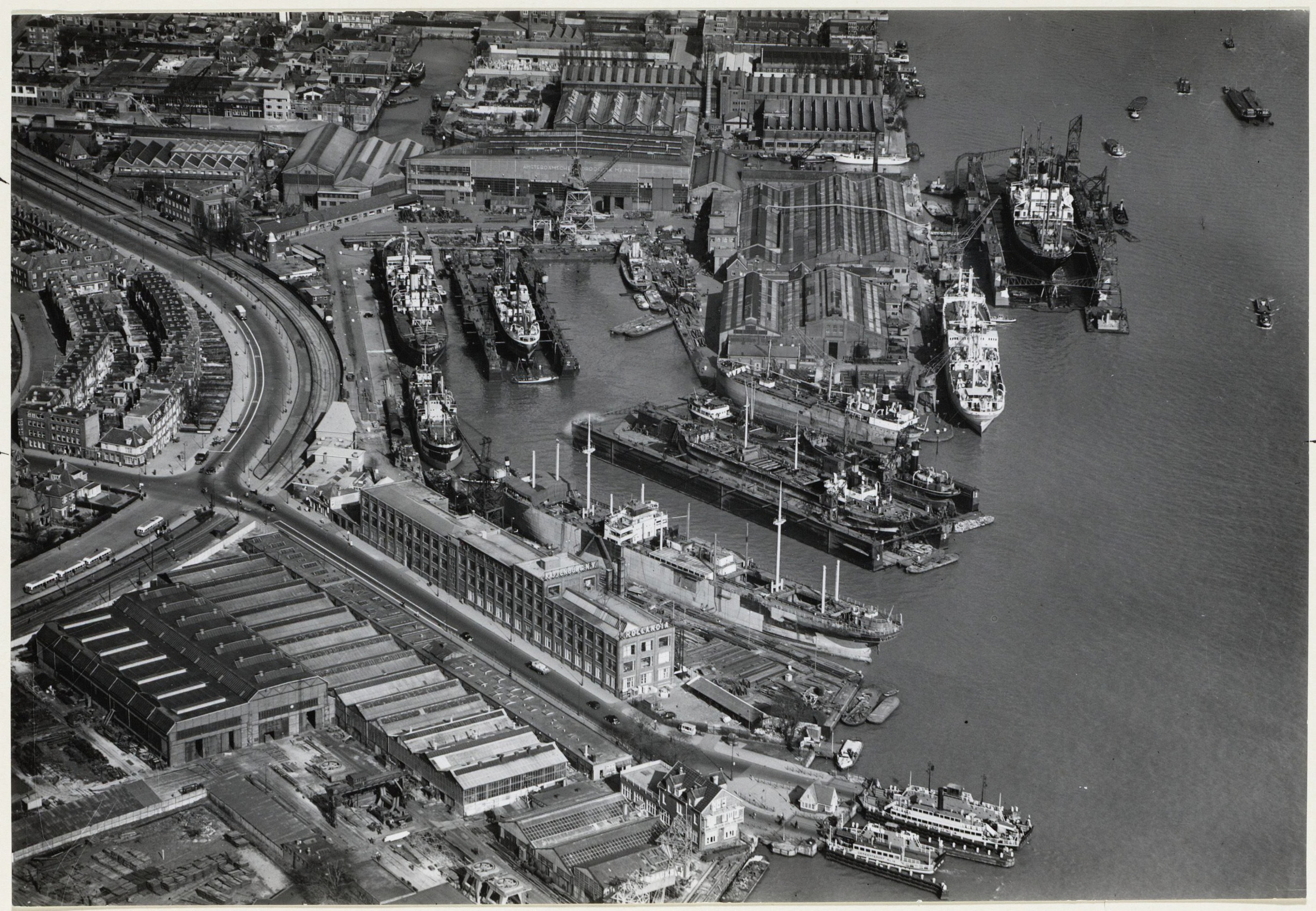
The ADM on 6 April 1950

The acquisition of the even larger Julianadok became part of a bigger plan to concentrate all ADM dry docks on one location. On 9 February 1909, Koningsdok was moved to a location in a new dock northwest of Koninginnnedok. On 13 January 1911 Koninginnedok was moved to this same dock, where it would be moored between six dolphins. This was actually done while the German steamer SS Franz Horn was being repaired on top of her. Two tugboats of the Gebroerders Goedkoop, Antointette and Noord-Holland VII moved the dry dock about 500 m. During the move, Prinses Juliana was on top of Wilhelmina Drydock.

During World War II, all dry docks of the ADM were sabotaged by the German occupiers. After the war Koninginnedok was repaired without much trouble. A 1950 image shows that Koninginnedok underwent several changes. E.g. the boiler houses on top of the sides were removed and cranes were added.

=== Decommissioned ===
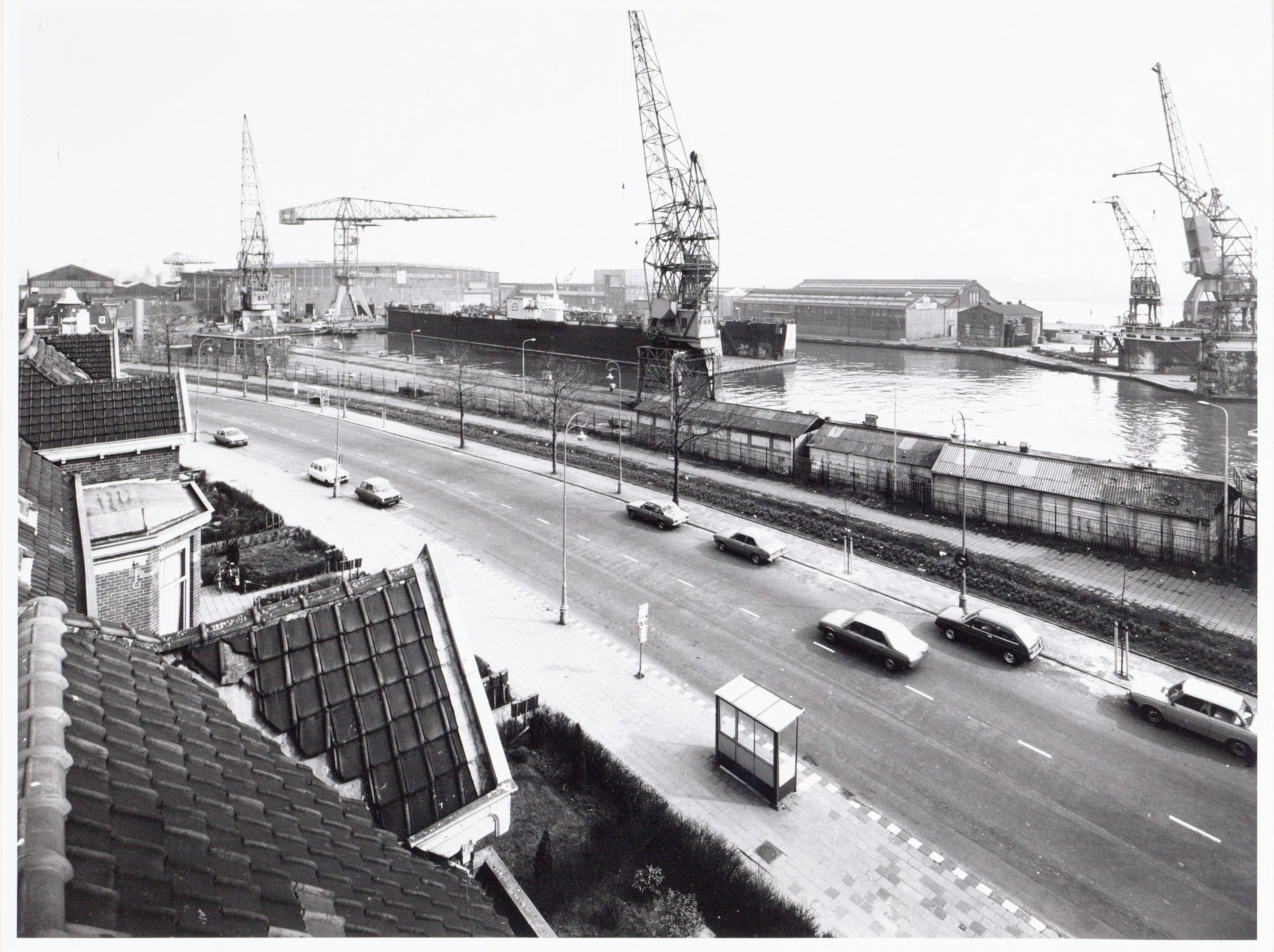
At ADM on 26 March 1980

Koninginnedok was used until at least the late 1970s. In 1979/80, the ADM shipyard was moved from the Meeuwenlaan 60-64 to the terrain of the new ADM B.V. shipyard at the Klaprozenweg. Meanwhile, the ADM NV became a holding company that participated in ADM B.V., but retained the ownership of numerous assets. Amongst these two docks.

It's not immediately clear which docks ADM N.V. retained. A model of the new ADM B.V. shipyard showed two floating dry docks that can be identified as the old Hendrik Drydock and the relatively new Dok 5. There are multiple pictures of Koninginnedok and Wilhelminadok at the Meeuwenlaan in 1980, e.g. one of 26 March, see image. The conclusion is that Koninginnedok and Wilhelmina Dock were not included in the new company. As she was about a 100 years old in 1980, one can guess that Koninginnedok was broken up shortly after.
