= Clean UP, Green UP =

Clean UP, Green UP is an initiative to increase the awareness on environmentally friendly works done in Uttar Pradesh by the state government. Just like Swachh Bharat Abhiyan It covers initiatives pertaining to solar energy, ban on plastics, cycle tracks, conservation of forests and animals/birds, etc. Uttar Pradesh is in the Guinness Book of World Records for planting most number of saplings in one day, with the government distributing and planting 10,38,578 saplings in ten locations on 7 November 2015, as part of the initiative.
