= Plastic bag ban =

Laws regarding plastic shopping bags

A plastic bag ban or charge is a law that restricts the use of lightweight plastic bags at retail establishments. In the early 21st century, there has been a global trend towards the phase-out of lightweight plastic bags. Single-use plastic shopping bags, commonly made from low-density polyethylene plastic, have traditionally been given for free to customers by stores when purchasing goods: the bags have long been considered a convenient, cheap, and hygienic way of transporting items. Lightweight plastic carrier bags include all carrier bags with a wall thickness below 50 microns and are not biodegradable. Problems associated with plastic bags include use of non-renewable resources (such as crude oil, gas and coal), difficulties during disposal, and environmental impacts. Concurrently with the reduction in lightweight plastic bags, shops have introduced reusable shopping bags.

Various governments have banned the sale of lightweight bags, have taxed manufacturers for the production of lightweight bags, or charged the sale of lightweight plastic bags in stores, placing the tax burden on consumers. The Bangladesh government of Begum Khaleda Zia was the first to do so in 2002, imposing a total ban on lightweight plastic bags. Between 2010 and 2019, the number of public policies intended to phase out plastic carryout bags tripled. As of 2024, regulations have been introduced in 127 countries, with 27 countries implementing bans on the sale to consumers and 30 countries implementing charges on the sale to consumers.

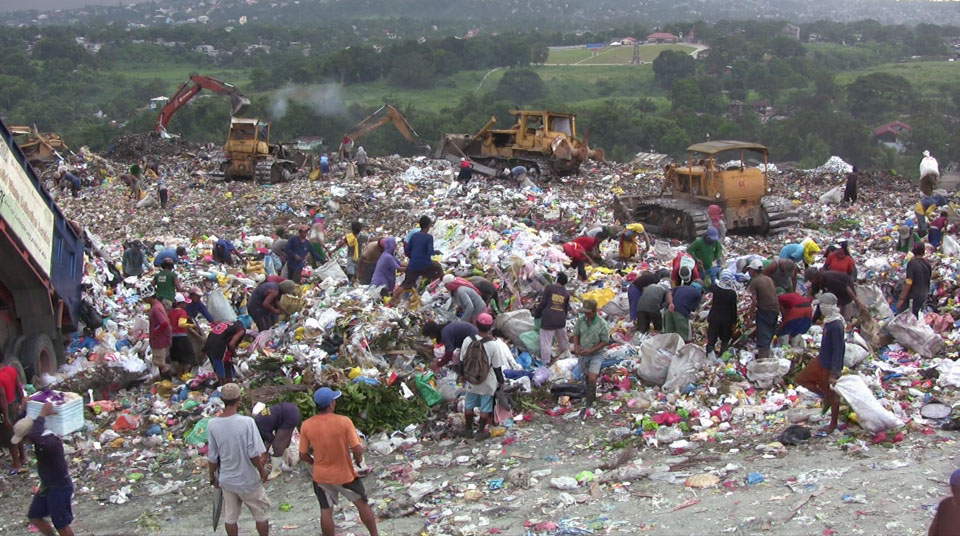
Plastic waste on the mounds of garbage in the Philippines

== Issues ==
Plastic bags cause many minor and major ecological and environmental issues. The most general issue with plastic bags is the amount of waste produced. Many plastic bags end up on streets and subsequently pollute major water sources, rivers, and streams.

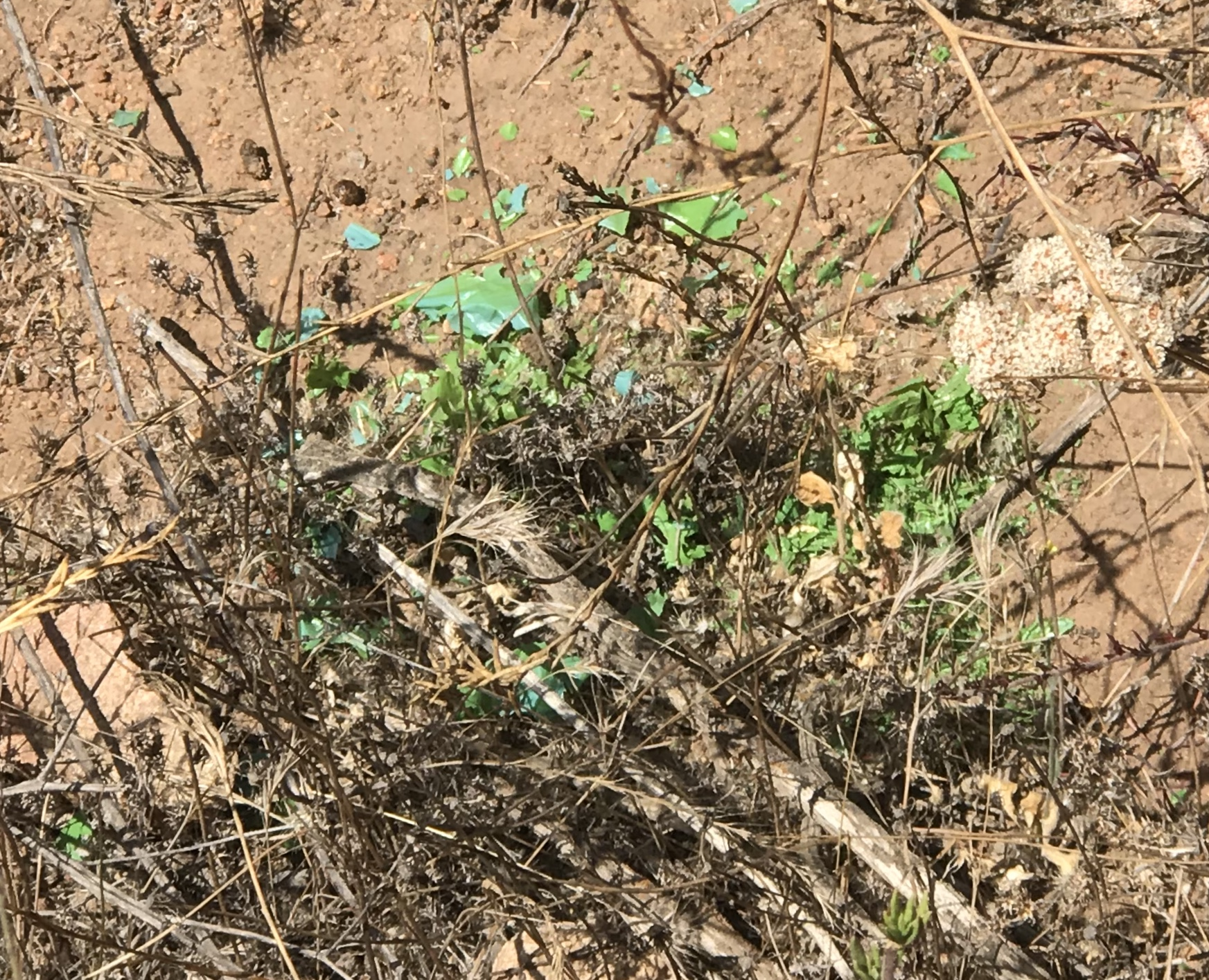
Photodegraded plastic bag adjacent to hiking trail. Approx. 2,000 pieces 1 to 25 mm (1/32 to 31/32 in), three months' exposure outdoors.

Even when disposed of properly, they take many years to decompose and break down, generating large amounts of garbage over long periods of time. Improperly discarded bags have polluted waterways, clogged sewers and been found in oceans, affecting the ecosystem of marine creatures. Huge volumes of plastic waste end up in the oceans every year, causing threats to marine species and disruption to the marine food chain. Several microbial species colonize on plastic particles enhancing their harmfulness, and plastic particles driven by winds form garbage patches in various parts of the oceans. The UN estimates that there will be more plastics than fish in the oceans by 2050 unless countries comes up with urgent measures to promote efficient production, use and waste management of plastics throughout their life cycles.

Two primary kinds of direct damage to wildlife are entanglement and ingestion. Animals can become entangled and drown. Plastic bags are often ingested by animals that cannot distinguish them from food. As a result, they clog their intestines which results in death by starvation. Plastic bags can block drains, trap birds and kill livestock. The World Wide Fund for Nature has estimated that over 100,000 whales, seals, and turtles die every year as a result of eating or being trapped by plastic bags. In India, an estimated number of 20 cows die per day as a result of ingesting plastic bags and having their digestive systems clogged by the bags. It is also very common across Africa to have sewers and drain systems clogged by bags which cause severe cases of malaria due to the increased population of mosquitoes that live on the flooded sewers. The term "white pollution" has been coined in China to describe the local and global effects of discarded plastic bags upon the environment.

Lightweight plastic bags are also blown into trees and other plants and can be mistaken for food. Plastic bags break down by polymer degradation but not by biodegradation. As a result, any toxic additives they contain—including flame retardants, antimicrobials, and plasticizers—will be released into the environment. Many of those toxins directly affect the endocrine systems of organisms, which control almost every cell in the body. Research shows the average operating "lifespan" of a plastic bag to be approximately 20 years.

Plastic bags dumped in the Pacific Ocean can end up in the Great Pacific Garbage Patch. 80% of the plastic waste comes from land; the rest comes from oil platforms and ships. This can be eaten by marine animals, and block their breathing passages and digestive systems. Plastic bags not only add to the Great Pacific garbage patch, they can be washed ashore around the world.

== Methods ==
The two most popular methods of phasing out lightweight plastic bags are charges and bans, but there are a number of methods which have been found effective.

=== Lightweight plastic charges ===
Lightweight plastic charges include all taxes, levies, and fees placed on the sale of single use plastic bags to consumers. As of 2018, 30 countries charge consumers when they purchase lightweight carrier bags. The charge strategy has all the same results in plastic bag reduction as a plastic bag ban, with the additional benefit of creating a new revenue source. The plastic bag charge method also protects consumer choice, which the ban does not.

=== Lightweight plastic bans ===
Lightweight plastic bans constitute strict bans on the sale and distribution of single use plastic bags to consumers by retailers. As of 2018, 27 countries had completely banned the sale of plastic lightweight carrier bags. The ban strategy, while being the most effective and direct approach to reduce consumption of single-use plastic bags, increases the consumption of non-banned bags, plastic carriers slightly thicker than the lightweight bags which are still disposed of by consumers. In this way, bans decrease lightweight bag consumption, but increase other plastic carrier consumption and pollution.

=== Taxing and regulating manufacturers ===
Many countries have decided to tax manufacturers and distributors of lightweight plastic bags, instead of placing the responsibility upon consumers. As of 2018, 27 countries taxed the manufacturing and production of plastic bags while 63 countries placed mandates for extended producer responsibility for single-use plastic. Extended producer responsibility means that producers carry the burden of responsibility even after the consumer purchases their products, meaning on a practical level that producers are required to help pay and support programs that properly recycle these bags or that producers are encouraged to change the design of their bags. This is the only method of regulation that places the burden on producers, instead of consumers.

=== Recycling ===
Recycling of plastic bags can be another method of phase-out. However, only 5% of plastic bags make it to recycling facilities. Even when bags are brought to recycling facilities, they often fly out of these bins or recycling trucks and end up as litter on the streets. Another issue with recycling is that different bags are made from different yet aesthetically similar types of plastics. Bags can be either made of bioplastics or biodegradable plastics, and if accidentally combined in a compost, the bioplastics could contaminate the biodegradable composting. These bags can also jam recycling equipment when mixed with other types of plastic, which can be costly to repair. For example, costs of repairs rounded out to be about $1 million per year in San Jose, California.

== Impact ==
Grocery bag comparisons of environmental impact

Grocery bag comparisons for greenhouse gas emissions

Across the world, plastic bag regulation has worked to decrease lightweight plastic bag usage rates, with usage rates after lightweight plastic charges best demonstrating this point.

According to a 2018 study in the American Economic Journal: Economic Policy, a five-cent tax on disposable bags reduced disposable bag usage by 40 percentage points. According to a 2019 review of existing studies, levies and taxes led to a 66% reduction in usage in Denmark, between 74 and 90% in South Africa, Belgium, Hong Kong, Washington D.C., Santa Barbara, the UK, and around 50% in Botswana and China.

In Ireland, the introduction of a €0.15 levy on plastic bags in 2002 led to a 90% reduction in usage within weeks, with the policy receiving widespread public support. Similarly, Portugal's 2015 plastic bag tax resulted in significant decreases in consumption, as consumers adapted by using reusable bags. Between 2010 and 2014 after a city-wide ban, there was a 50% decrease in the presence of single-use plastic bag Seattle's residential waste, despite the city's population growing by 10%.

In Kenya, a 2017 ban on plastic bags received favorable support from approximately 67% of consumers, who reported increased use of reusable bags and perceived improvements in cleanliness and waste management. Conversely, in Sweden, the repeal of a tax on single-use plastic bags in 2024 raised concerns about potential increases in plastic consumption, despite the tax's prior success in reducing usage by 75% between 2020 and 2021.

A 2025 study published in the journal Science analysed data from more than 45,000 shoreline cleanup events across the United States and it found that plastic bag bans and fees are now associated with a 25-47% reduction in litter in comparison with areas that do not have these policies. The effects of this are strengthening over time. Full bans were more effective than partial bans because partial bans exempt thicker plastic bags.

Yet despite these reductions, the study found that plastic bag litter is continuing to increase in an overall sense because in both areas that have policies in place and those that do not. This indicates that policies slow the growth down of the problem but does not reverse it.

They persist for long periods of time and are a risk to wildlife as they can be accidentally ingested or entangled within.

California's 2014 ban on thin plastic bags exempted thicker plastic bags that were classified as reusable and could be sold at checkout for at least 10 cents. Plastic bag waste subsequently increased from 157,385 tons in 2014 to 231,072 tons in 2021. In 2024, the state enacted SB 1053, which eliminated plastic film bags from checkout beginning January 1, 2026.

While plastic bag regulations can lead to substantial reductions in usage, the overall environmental impact depends on policy design, enforcement, and consumer behavior.

== Criticism ==
Plastic bag bans can lead to larger black markets in plastic bags. Studies show that plastic bag bans can shift people away from using thin plastic bags, but it can also increase the use of unregulated single use paper bags or unregulated thicker plastic bags in areas where these are provided for free. Further, the bans can drive significant increases in sales of trash bags because people could no longer reuse their old grocery bags for things like lining small trash cans.

The thicker reusable bags that are intended to replace single-use bags are recyclable. However, they require a specific recycling process, which requires that they be disposed of separately from other household recyclable materials. An estimated 6% of plastic bags are recycled. This can lead to an overall increase in plastic waste from plastic bags.

The production of some non-plastic bags (e.g. paper, cotton, using virgin plastic such as plastic having thickness of 50 micron) can produce more greenhouse gas emissions than plastic bags, which means that greenhouse gas emissions may increase on net following plastic bag bans. Alternatives to plastic bags would need to be reused over a hundred times to make them more environmentally friendly than plastic bags. They are also viewed as less sanitary than plastic because they can bring germs from outside the store to high contact volume surfaces like carts and check out stands.

=== Consumer reception ===
The effectiveness of single use plastic bag regulations, and whether they are adopted in the first place, depends on consumer reception. Consumer responses to plastic bag regulations vary across regions and policy types. In Kenya, the 2017 plastic bag ban received favorable support from approximately 67% of consumers, who reported increased use of reusable bags and perceived improvements in cleanliness and waste management. In contrast, some consumers in the United States have expressed dissatisfaction with restrictions on plastic bags. For instance, Kroger's initiative to phase out plastic bags by 2025 faced backlash from shoppers who find the alternatives less durable and practical.

== Legislation around the world ==
=== Summary ===
Phase out of lightweight plastic bags around the world (laws passed but not yet in effect are not shown on map): Plastic bags banned Charge on some plastic bags Voluntary charge agreement Partial charge or ban (municipal or regional levels)

Legislation	Country	United Nations Regional Group	Notes	Ref.
Ban	Afghanistan	Asia-Pacific		
Ban	Albania	Eastern Europe	Since 2018.	
Ban	Andorra	Western Europe and Others	Since 2017.	
	Angola	Africa	Ban planned on 22 September 2026.	
Ban	Anguilla	N/A	Since 2018.	
Ban	Antigua and Barbuda	Latin America		
Regional ban	Argentina	Latin America	Banned in several provinces and cities.	
Ban	Armenia	Eastern Europe	Since 2022.	
Ban	Australia	Western Europe and Others	Lightweight plastic bags banned in supermarkets in all states and territories. Initially replaced by reusable thick 15¢ bags in the two major supermarket chains, this was phased out by June 2023. Legislation covering other retailers varies by state/territory. Norfolk Island has a voluntary agreement with retailers.	
Ban	Austria	Western Europe and Others	Since 2020.	
Ban	Azerbaijan	Eastern Europe	Since 2021.	
Ban	Bahamas	Latin America	Since 1 July 2020.	
Ban	Bahrain	Asia-Pacific	Since 21 July 2019.	
Ban	Bangladesh	Asia-Pacific	Since 2002.	
Ban	Barbados	Latin America	Since April 2019.	
	Belarus	Eastern Europe	Charge is being considered.	
Ban	Belgium	Western Europe and Others	Since 2016 in Wallonia, 2017 in Brussels, 2019 in Flanders.	
Ban	Belize	Latin America	Since 22 April 2019 (Earth Day).	
Ban	Benin	Africa	Since November 2017.	
Ban	Bhutan	Asia-Pacific		
Regional ban	Bolivia	South America	Banned in La Paz.	
Charge	Bosnia and Herzegovina	Eastern Europe		
Ban	Botswana	Africa	Since November 2018.	
Regional ban	Brazil	Latin America	Banned in São Paulo and the state of Rio de Janeiro.	
	British Indian Ocean Territory	N/A	Move from plastic to paper bags planned, method not announced.	
Voluntary charge	Brunei	Asia-Pacific		
Charge	Bulgaria	Eastern Europe		
Ban	Burkina Faso	Africa	Since 2015.	
Ban	Burundi	Africa	Since 22 August 2019.	
Charge	Cambodia	Asia-Pacific	Since October 2017.	
Ban	Cameroon	Africa	Since April 2014.	
Ban	Canada	Western Europe and Others	Since 20 Dec 2022.	See section
Ban	Cape Verde	Africa	Since 2017.	
Ban	Central African Republic	Africa	Since 2021.	
Regional ban	Chad	Africa	Banned in N'Djamena.	
Ban	Chile	Latin America	Since February 2019.	
Ban	China	Asia-Pacific	Since 2022. Charge applied since June 2008. Replaced by ban, excluding fresh produce markets until 2025. Hong Kong and Macau apply a charge.	
Charge	Taiwan	Asia-Pacific	Since 2003. Ban planned for 2030.	
Ban	Colombia	Latin America	Since July 2017. Charge applied to reusable bags.	
Ban	Comoros	Africa	Since April 2018.	
Ban	Cook Islands	N/A	Since July 2025.	
Ban	Costa Rica	Latin America	Since 2021.	
Ban	Democratic Republic of the Congo	Africa	Since 2018.	
Ban	Republic of the Congo	Africa	Since 2011.	
Ban	Croatia	Eastern Europe	Since 2022.	
Ban	Cyprus	Western Europe and Others	Since 18 February 2023.	
Charge	Czech Republic	Eastern Europe	Since 2018.	
Charge	Denmark	Western Europe and Others	A tax on plastic bags since 1993. There is also a tax in Greenland.	
Ban	Djibouti	Africa		
Ban	Dominica	North America	Since 2019.	
Ban	East Timor	Asia-Pacific	Since 23 February 2021.	
Charge	Ecuador	Latin America	Since 9 May 2020. Banned in the Galápagos Islands.	
Regional ban	Egypt	Africa	Banned in Red Sea Governorate.	
Charge	Equatorial Guinea	Africa	Charge since 12 December 2019.	
Ban	Eritrea	Africa	Since 2005.	
Charge	Estonia	Eastern Europe	Since July 2017.	
Ban	Eswatini	Africa	Ban from 1 December 2024.	
Ban	Ethiopia	Africa	Since 2026.	
Ban	Fiji	Asia-Pacific	Since 2020.	
Voluntary charge	Finland	Western Europe and Others		
Ban	France	Western Europe and Others	Since July 2016. Also banned in Overseas France.	
Ban	Gabon	Africa	Since 2010.	
Ban	Gambia	Africa	Since 2015.	
Ban	Georgia	Eastern Europe	Since 2017.	
Ban	Germany	Western Europe and Others	Since 2022.	
Ban	Gibraltar	N/A	Since 2019.	
Charge	Greece	Western Europe and Others	Since 2018.	
Ban	Grenada	Latin America	Since February 2019.	
Ban	Guatemala	Latin America	Since 2021.	
Regional bans and voluntary charges	Guernsey	N/A	Ban in Alderney. Voluntary charge in Guernsey.	
Ban	Guinea	Africa	Since 2024.	
Ban	Guinea-Bissau	Africa	Since 2016.	
Ban	Guyana	Latin America	Since 2021.	
Ban	Haiti	Latin America		
Regional ban	Honduras	Latin America	Banned in the Bay Islands Department.	
Charge	Hungary	Eastern Europe	Since 2012.	
Ban	Iceland	Western Europe and Others	Since 2021.	
Ban	India	Asia-Pacific	Since 1 July 2022	
Regional bans and charges	Indonesia	Asia-Pacific	Charges in 23 cities. Banned in Bali since June 2019 and Jakarta since July 2020.	
Regional ban	Iraq	Asia-Pacific	Banned in Kurdistan Region.	
Charge	Ireland	Western Europe and Others	Since March 2002, a 0.15 Euro tax has been added to all plastic bags, increasing to 0.22 Euro in July 2007. Since these charges were added, there has been a 90% reduction in the use of plastic bags.	
Ban	Isle of Man	N/A	Full ban in force from 18 October 2023, including products made from oxo-degradable plastics.	
Charge	Israel	Western Europe and Others	Since January 2017.	
Ban	Italy	Western Europe and Others	Since January 2011.	
Ban	Ivory Coast	Africa	Since 2014.	
Ban	Jamaica	Latin America	Since January 2019.	
Charge	Japan	Asia-Pacific	Since July 2020.	
Ban	Jersey	N/A	Ban since July 2022. Reusable bags subject to 70p charge.	
	Kazakhstan	Asia-Pacific	Ban is being considered.	
Ban	Kenya	Africa	Since 28 August 2017.	
Ban	Kiribati	Asia-Pacific	Since October 2020.	
Ban	Kosovo	Eastern Europe	Since 29 September 2023.	
Regional ban	Kyrgyzstan	Asia-Pacific	Banned in tourist areas. Ban planned for 2027.	
Charge	Latvia	Eastern Europe	Since January 2019. Ban to be implemented by 2025.	
Regional ban	Lebanon	Asia-Pacific	Banned in Byblos.	
	Lesotho	Africa	Charge planned.	
Charge	Lithuania	Eastern Europe	Since 31 December 2018.	
Charge	Luxembourg	Western Europe and Others		
Ban	Madagascar	Africa	Since 2015.	
	Malawi	Africa	Bans revoked several times.	
Regional charge	Malaysia	Asia-Pacific	Charges in two states.	
Ban	Maldives	Asia-Pacific	Since June 2021.	
Ban	Mali	Africa		
Ban	Malta	Western Europe and Others	Since 2022.	
Ban	Marshall Islands	Asia-Pacific		
Ban	Mauritania	Africa	Since 2013.	
Ban	Mauritius	Africa	Since 2016.	
Regional ban	Mexico	Latin America	Banned in 18 states and Mexico City.	
Ban	Micronesia	Asia-Pacific	Since 31 December 2020.	
Ban	Moldova	Eastern Europe	Since 2021.	
Ban	Monaco	Western Europe and Others	Since 2016.	
Ban	Mongolia	Asia-Pacific	Since March 2019.	
Ban	Montenegro	Eastern Europe	Since 20 October 2024.	
Ban	Morocco	Africa	Since July 2016.	
Charge	Mozambique	Africa	Since 5 February 2016. Ban to be implemented by 2024.	
Regional ban	Myanmar	Asia-Pacific	Banned in Yangon.	
Regional ban	Namibia	Africa	Banned in protected places. Levy approved but not implemented.	
Ban	Nauru	Asia-Pacific	Since 23 April 2021.	
Ban	Nepal	Asia-Pacific		
Charge	Netherlands	Western Europe and Others	Since 2016. Banned in Aruba, Curaçao, Sint Maarten and Caribbean Netherlands.	
Ban	New Zealand	Western Europe and Others	Since July 2019. Also banned in Niue and the Cook Islands.	
Ban	Niger	Africa		
Ban	Nigeria	Africa		
Ban	Niue	N/A	Banned since 2020.	
Charge	North Macedonia	Eastern Europe	Since 2009.	
Voluntary charge	Norway	Western Europe and Others		
Ban	Oman	Asia-Pacific	Since 2021.	
Ban	Pakistan	Asia-Pacific	Banned independently in each of the country's provinces and territories from 1994 to 2019.	
Ban	Palau	Asia-Pacific		
Ban	Panama	Latin America	Since 20 July 2019.	
Ban	Papua New Guinea	Asia-Pacific	Since 2016.	
Charge	Peru	Latin America	Since August 2019.	
Regional ban and charges	Philippines	Asia-Pacific	Banned in select cities of Metro Manila, excluding Taguig, Malabon, Caloocan, Valenzuela, Navotas and San Juan.	
Charge	Poland	Eastern Europe	Since 2018.	
Charge	Portugal	Western Europe and Others	Since 2016.	
Ban	Qatar	Asia-Pacific	Since 15 November 2022.	
Ban	Romania	Eastern Europe	Since 2019.	
	Russia	Eastern Europe	Ban planned for 2024.	
Ban	Rwanda	Africa	Since 2008.	
Ban	Saint Kitts and Nevis	Latin America	Since 31 March 2025.	
Ban	Saint Vincent and the Grenadines	Latin America	Since August 2020.	
Ban	Samoa	Asia-Pacific	Since 2019.	
Ban	San Marino	Western Europe and Others	Since 1 June 2021.	
Ban	São Tomé and Príncipe	Africa	Since 2021.	
Ban	Senegal	Africa	Since April 2015.	
Charge	Serbia	Eastern Europe	Since 2018. Banned in Belgrade and Novi Sad.	
Ban	Seychelles	Africa	Since 2017.	
Charge	Singapore	Asia-Pacific	Since 3 July 2023 at larger supermarkets.	
Charge	Slovakia	Eastern Europe	Since March 2017.	
Charge	Slovenia	Eastern Europe	Since 2019.	
Ban	Solomon Islands	Asia-Pacific	Since 1 September 2023.	
Ban	Somalia	Africa	Since 30 June 2024. Also banned in Somaliland.	
Charge	South Africa	Africa	Since 2004.	
Ban	South Korea	Asia-Pacific	Since August 2018.	
Ban	South Sudan	Africa		
Charge	Spain	Western Europe And Others	Since July 2018. Banned in Balearic Islands since 2020.	
Ban	Sri Lanka	Asia	Since 2017.	
Regional ban	Sudan	Africa	Banned in Khartoum State.	
Charge	Sweden	Western Europe and Others		
Voluntary charge	Switzerland	Western Europe and Others	Banned in Geneva since 2020. Voluntary charge elsewhere.	
Ban	Tajikistan	Asia-Pacific	Since January 2025.	
Ban	Tanzania	Africa	Since June 2019.	
Ban	Thailand	Asia-Pacific	Since 2021.	
Ban	Togo	Africa	Since July 2018.	
Ban	Tunisia	Africa	Since March 2017.	
Charge	Turkey	Western Europe and Others	Also a ban in some regions. Turkish-controlled Northern Cyprus also applies a charge.	
Ban	Turks and Caicos	N/A	Since January 2019.	
Ban	Tuvalu	Asia-Pacific	Since August 2019.	
Ban	Uganda	Africa	Since September 2007.	
Ban	Ukraine	Eastern Europe	Since 10 December 2021.	
Ban	United Arab Emirates	Asia-Pacific	Since 1 January 2024.	
Charge	United Kingdom	Western Europe and Others	England: 5p levy introduced in 2015. Raised to 10p in 2021.	
Charge	United Kingdom	Western Europe and Others	Northern Ireland: 5p levy since 2013. Raised to 25p in 2022.	
Charge	United Kingdom	Western Europe and Others	Scotland: 5p charge since 2014. Raised to 10p in 2021.	
Charge	United Kingdom	Western Europe and Others	Wales: 5p charge since 2011. Ban proposed.	
Regional bans and charges	United States	Western Europe and Others	Banned in twelve states (one de facto) and five territories. Charge in Washington, DC. Bans and charges in several municipalities.	See main article
Ban	Uruguay	South America	Since July 2019.	
Charge	Uzbekistan	Asia-Pacific	Since 2019. Ban planned for 2027.	
Ban	Vanuatu	Asia-Pacific	Since 31 January 2018.	
Ban	Vatican City	Western Europe and Others	Since 2019.	
Ban	Vietnam	Asia-Pacific	Since 2026.	
Ban	Yemen	Asia-Pacific		
	Zambia	Africa	Ban announced but not implemented.	
Ban	Zimbabwe	Africa		

=== Africa ===
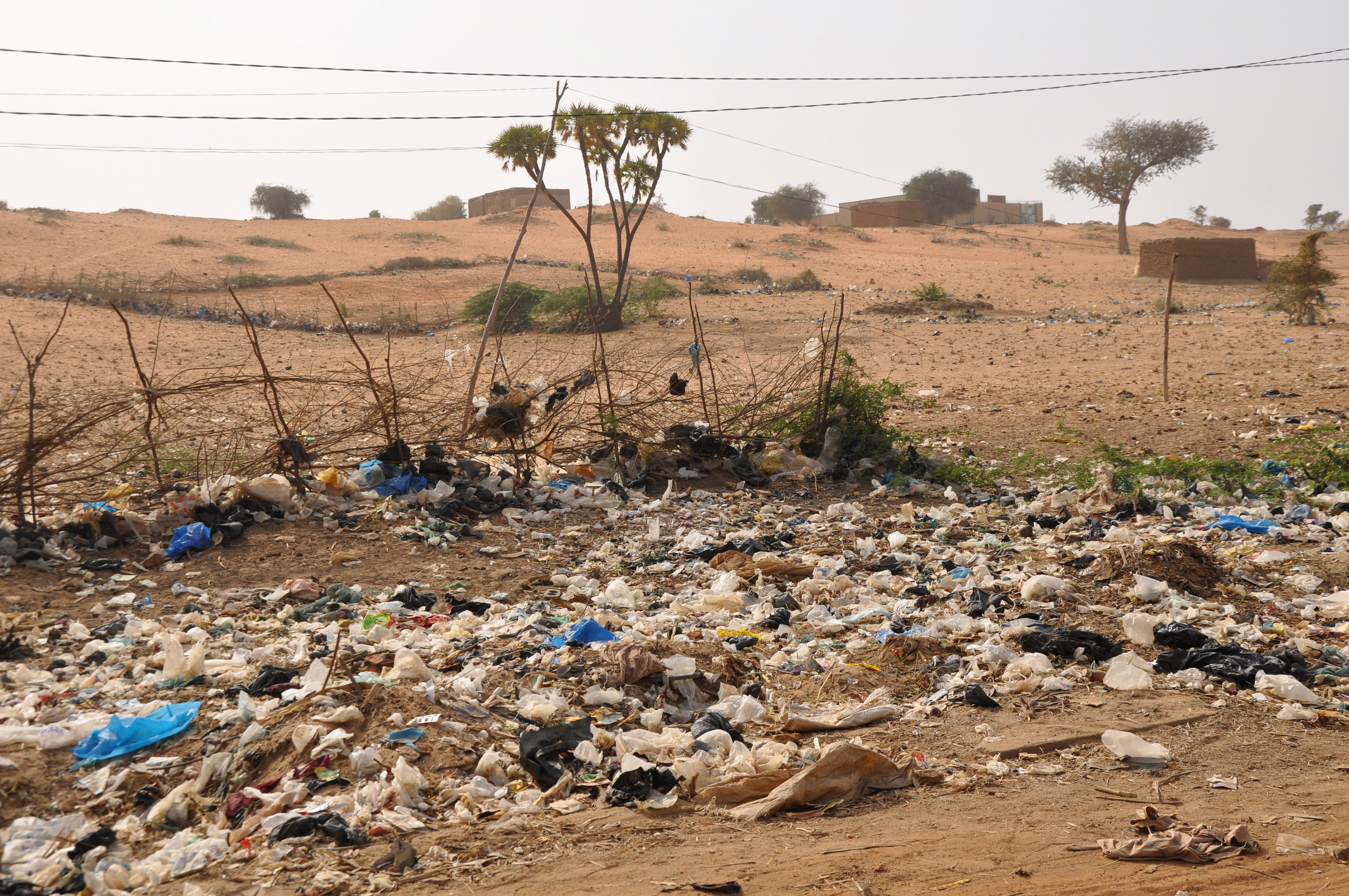
Plastic waste in Karey Gorou, Niger

==== Kenya ====
Kenya made the first attempt to ban the manufacturing and importation of plastic bags in 2007 and 2011 as a way to protect the environment. The 2007 and 2011 ban targeting plastics below 30 microns failed after manufacturers and retail outlets threatened to pass on the cost of using other materials to consumers. In 2017 the cabinet secretary of Environment and Natural resources, Judi Wakhungu, banned the use, manufacture and importation of all plastic bags used for commercial and household packaging under Gazette notice number 2356. On 28 August 2017, Kenya began implementing a countrywide ban of single-use plastic bags. Primary packaging bags, hospital waste bags, and garbage bin liners have been exempted from the ban. The ban has been hailed as one of the most stringent in the world, with fines of up to $40000, or four years in prison.

President Uhuru Kenyatta in 2019, during World Environment Day, further solidified Kenya's efforts to fight plastic pollution and in the sustainable management of waste by banning single-use plastics in protected natural areas. The ban, which came into effect on 5 June 2020, prohibits the use of plastics in National Parks, beaches, forests and conservation areas.

==== Nigeria ====
In May 2019, The House of Representatives of Nigeria banned the production, import and usage of plastic bags in the country.

==== Rwanda ====
Rwanda's plastic bag ban went into effect in 2008. The Rwandan government has encouraged other countries in their region to ban plastic bags as well, starting in 2011.

==== Somalia ====
Plastic bags were banned in the self-declared Republic of Somaliland on 1 March 2005 after a 120-day grace period that the government had given to the public to get rid of their stocks. The Ministry of Trade and Industries announced the cabinet decision in a decree titled: "Banning importation, production and use of plastic bags in the country". The bags had been nicknamed "the Hargeysa flower", as many of them ended up being blown around and getting stuck in trees and shrubs, posing a danger to livestock because the animals that feed on the leaves often ingest the bags accidentally. In 2015 the ban was repeated by Presidential Decree No. #JSL/M/XERM/249-3178/042015, again providing for a 120 days grace period to get rid of stocks. To ensure the implementation of the ban, the government constituted enforcement teams in 2016 to conduct special drives which launch probes into business stalls. At least 1000 men and women in uniform deployed into the main markets and shopping malls. The government announced fines against violators who continue selling plastic bags in the country.

==== South Africa ====
Plastic bags were a major concern in South Africa before the bag levy was introduced in 2004. The bags were never banned, but a levy was introduced, payable by the plastic bag manufacturer. The thicker plastic bags are levied and although this move initially caused outrage with consumers and an initial decline in volumes, consumers use has continually increased to several billion plastic shopping bags every year.

==== Tanzania ====
The Revolutionary Government of Zanzibar banned plastic bags in 2005. Tanzania introduced plans to implement a nationwide ban on plastic bags in 2006. However, its ratification had been delayed for more than ten years. The ban finally came into effect on 1 June 2019.

==== Tunisia ====
Tunisia introduced a ban on plastic bag distribution in supermarkets starting from 1 March 2017. An agreement was signed between the Ministry of Local Affairs and Environment and large supermarket chains in the country to enact the first phase of a process aiming to reduce the consumption of plastic bags. Tunisian activists are planning awareness campaigns to establish greener policies in the country.

==== Uganda ====
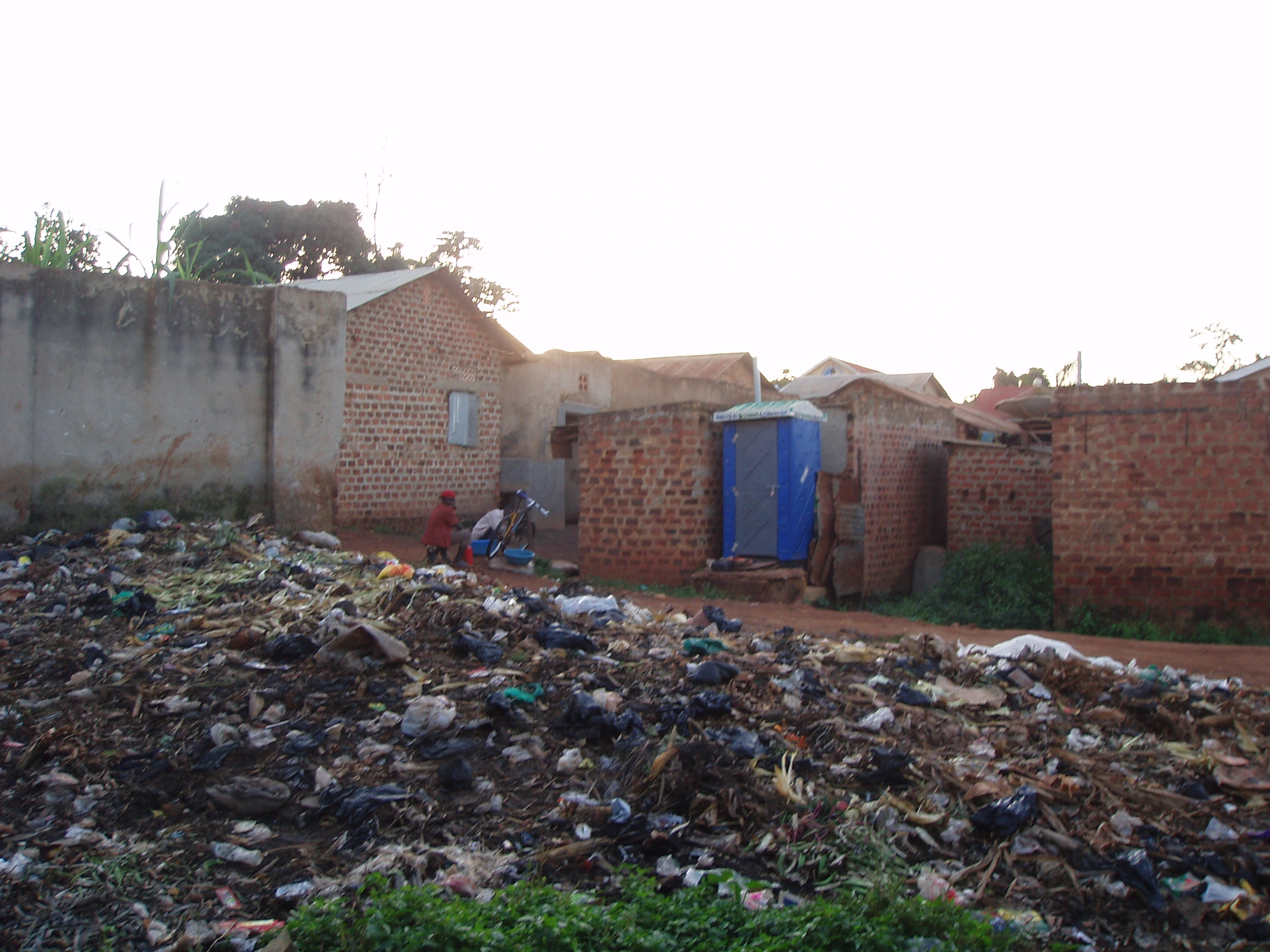
Heap of trash including plastic bags in Kampala, Uganda

Uganda introduced legislation in 2007 to ban the sale of lightweight plastic bags under 30 μm thick and tax thicker bags at a punitive rate of 120%. Although the laws came into effect in September of that year, they have not been enforced and have failed to measurably reduce the use of plastic bags. The law is not well enforced.

=== Asia ===
==== Bangladesh ====
A strict ban was introduced in Bangladesh in 2002 after floods caused by littered plastic bags submerged two-thirds of the country in water between 1988 and 1998. Plastic bags remain a big problem for sewerage system and waterways. Although polythene bags have been banned since 2002, enforcement was weak; in September 2024 the government announced that legal action would begin in supermarkets from 1 October 2024 and in all markets from 1 November 2024.

==== Cambodia ====
Cambodia passed legislation to impose a plastic bag tax in October 2017. Supermarkets now charge customers 400 Riels (10 US cents) per plastic bag should they need one.

==== China ====
A total plastic bag ban on ultra thin plastic bags and a fee on plastic bags was introduced in China on 1 June 2008. This came into effect because of the problems with sewerage and general waste. One 2009 survey suggests that plastic bag use fell between 60 and 80% in Chinese supermarkets, and 40 billion fewer bags were used. However, first hand accounts clearly indicate, the ban has seen limited success, and that the use of plastic bags remains prevalent. Street vendors and smaller stores, which make up a significant portion of retail in China, do not abide by the policy in part due to difficulties of enforcing the ban.

The term "white pollution" (Chinese: 白色污染; pinyin: baise wuran, less often "white garbage" Chinese: 白色垃圾; pinyin: baise laji) appears to be local to China and later to South Asia, enjoying far less use and recognition outside of the region. It refers to the color of white plastic shopping bags, styrofoam containers, and other light-colored materials that began turning up in visible volume in agricultural fields, the landscape, and waterways in the mid- to late 1990's. The first references to the term "white pollution" appear in official language at least as early as 1999, when the first bans were imposed by the State Council.

===== Hong Kong =====
Hong Kong forbids retailers from giving plastic bags under a certain thickness and for free. A 50 cent plastic bag levy was implemented on 1 April 2015 across Hong Kong. The use of plastic bags dropped 90% after the introduction of the levy. Signs show that Hong Kong is phasing out the use of plastic bags at a dramatic rate.

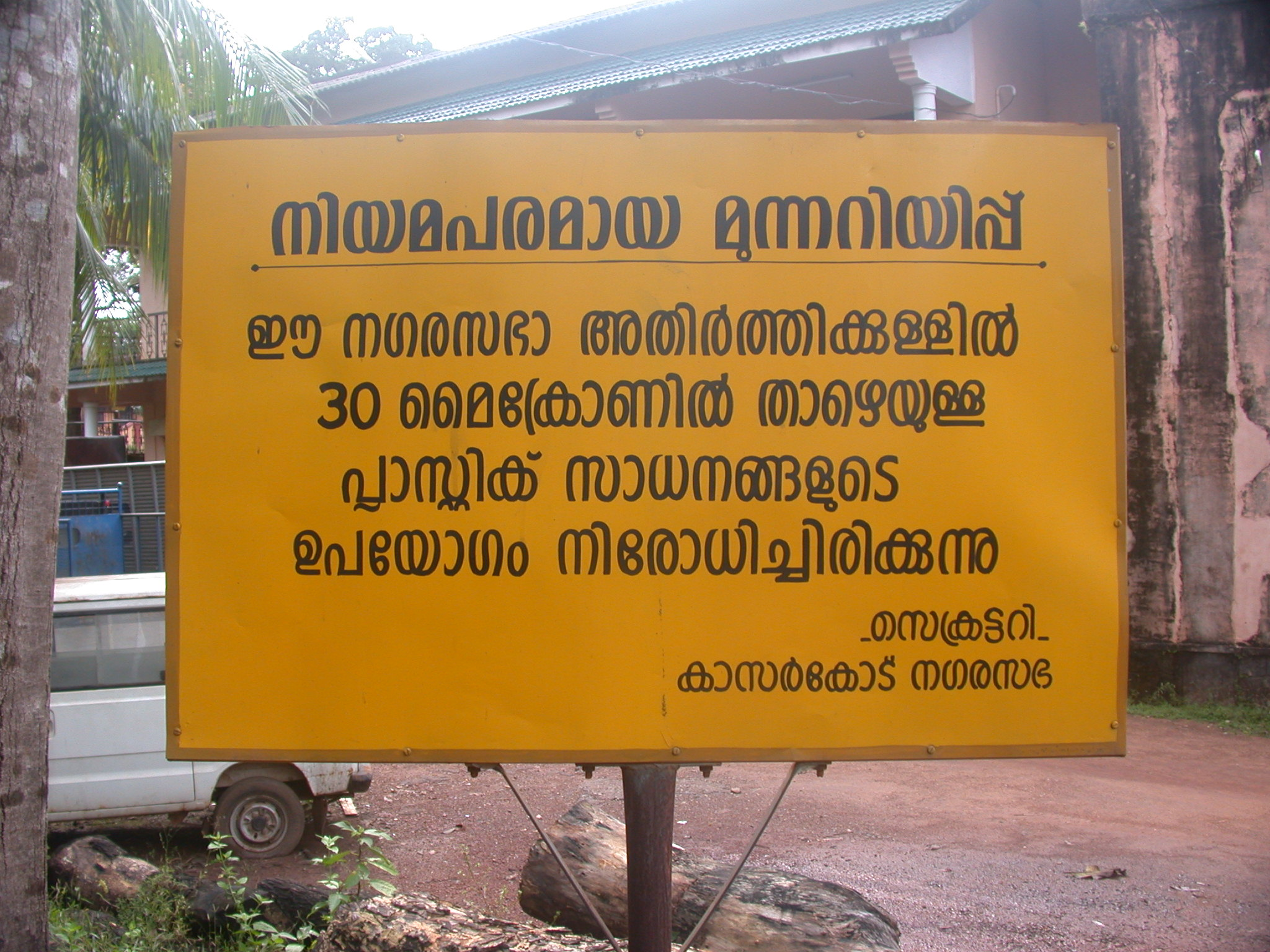
A sign proclaiming that polythene bags thinner than 30 μm are prohibited in Kasaragod, Kerala, India

==== India ====
In 2002, India banned the production of plastic bags below 20 μm in thickness to prevent plastic bags from clogging of the municipal drainage systems and to prevent the cows of India ingesting plastic bags as they confuse it for food. However, enforcement remains a problem.

The Ministry of Environment, Forest and Climate Change has also passed regulation to ban all polythene bags less than 50 microns on 18 March 2016. Due to poor implementation of this regulation, regional authorities (states and municipal corporations), have had to implement their own regulation.

In 2016, Sikkim, India's first fully organic state, banned the use of not only packaged drinking water bottles in any government meetings or functions but also food containers made from polystyrene foam all over the state.

Himachal Pradesh was the first state to ban plastic bags less than 30 μm. The Karnataka state became first state to ban all forms of plastic carry bags, plastic banners, plastic buntings, flex, plastic flags, plastic plates, plastic cups, plastic spoons, cling films and plastic sheets for spreading on dining tables irrespective of thickness including the above items made of thermacol and plastic which uses plastic micro beads. The state of Goa has banned bags up to 40 μm thick, while the city of Mumbai bans bags below a minimum thickness to 50 μm.

The state Government of Maharashtra banned plastic starting 23 June 2018. The state Government of Tamil Nadu also banned plastic starting 1 January 2019.

==== Indonesia ====
From 2016, the Environment Ministry obliged retailers in 23 cities across the archipelago (mini-markets, hypermarkets, and supermarkets) to charge consumers between Rp.200 and Rp.5,000 for each plastic bag, including degradable plastic bags. Money raised by the tax are used as public funds for waste management alongside non-governmental organizations.

The island of Bali banned single-use plastic bags, straws, and styrofoam, effective July 2019. Other major cities, including Jakarta, Surabaya, Bandung, Semarang and Bogor, have since also banned single use plastic bags.

==== Israel ====
Since January 2017, large retailers are required to charge consumers for plastic bags with handles, at NIS 0.10 for each bag. The tax revenues will be used to fund public waste-management programs. The average use of plastic bags in Israel in 2014 was 275 per person per year. Four months after the law came into force, the number of disposable plastic bags distributed by retailers subject to the law had dropped by 80%.

==== Philippines ====
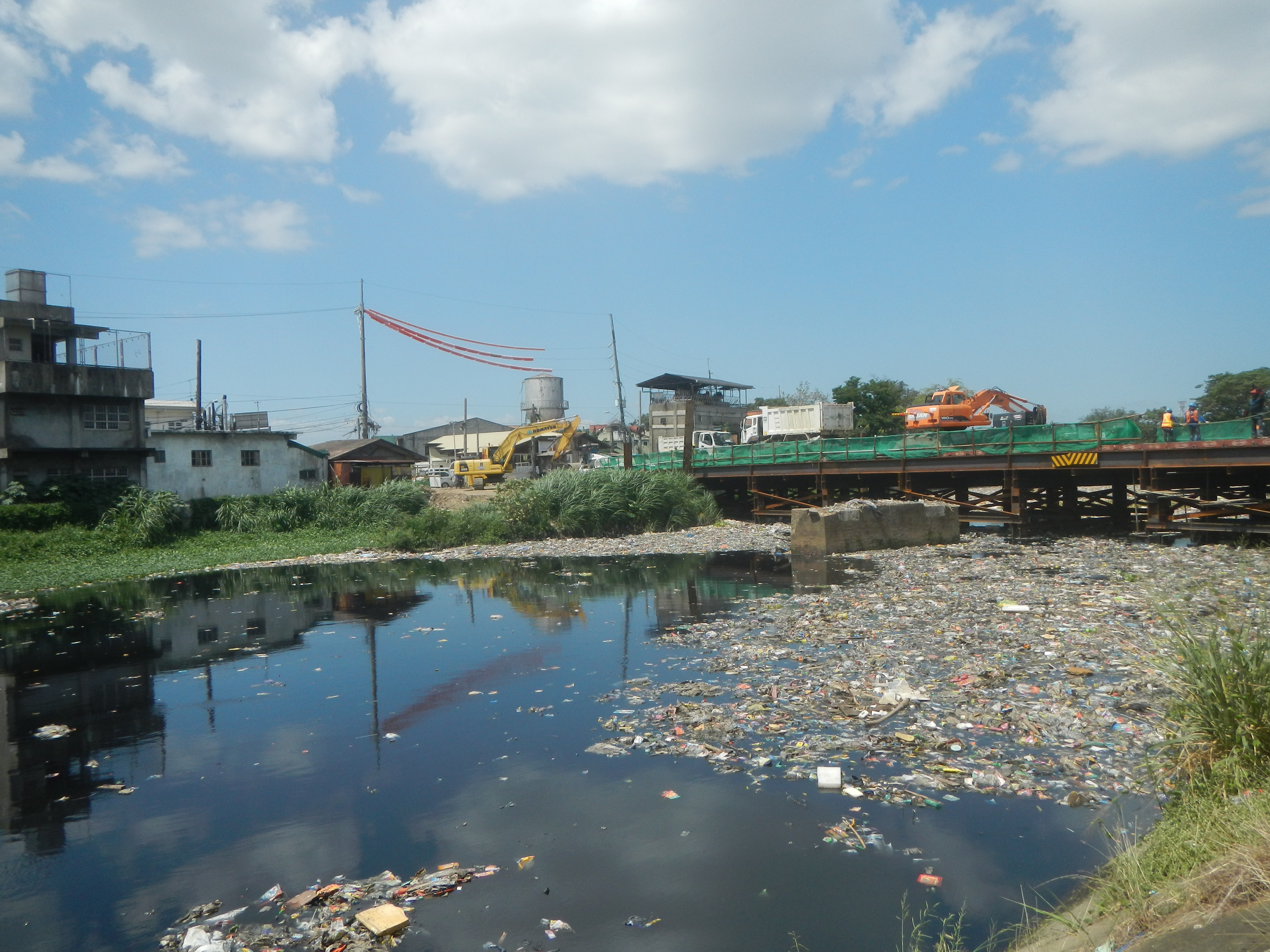
Waste pollution along a river in Marilao, north of Metro Manila in 2021

The Philippines is the world's third-largest ocean polluter despite a waste management act which came into effect 18 years ago. Efforts to regulate plastics have been hampered by corruption, lack of political will, and the proliferation and wide accessibility of single-use plastic products.

In 2010, Muntinlupa became the first local government in the National Capital Region to ban plastic bags and styrofoam in shops. This was followed by the measures in the cities of Las Piñas (2 January 2012), Pasig (1 January 2012), Quezon City (1 September 2012, bags for a fee), Pasay (1 September 2012, bags for a fee), Makati (30 June 2013), and Paranaque (June 2021).

Metro Manila cities that have delayed imposing regulations and bans include Taguig, Caloocan, Malabon, Valenzuela, Navotas and San Juan, which are home to hundreds of plastics and rubber manufacturing companies. In one city, a mayor's family owns a 60-hectare "Plastic City Industrial" compound.

On 4 July 2019, Senator Kiko Pangilinan filed a bill seeking to phase out single-use plastic products by prohibiting importation, manufacture and use in food establishments, stores, markets, and retailers.

==== Singapore ====
Large supermarkets in Singapore are required to charge a disposable carrier bag tax of at least 5 cents per bag, since 3 July 2023. Within the first six months of implementation, supermarkets reported a significant drop in the distribution of plastic bags, with some outlets experiencing a 50–80% reduction. The policy is enforced by the National Environment Agency.

==== Taiwan ====
In January 2003, Taiwan banned the free distribution of lightweight plastic bags. The ban prevented the owners of department stores, shopping malls, hypermarkets, convenience stores, fast food restaurants and regular restaurants from providing free plastic bags to their customers. Many stores have replaced plastic with recycled paper boxes. In 2006, however, the administration decided to begin allowing free plastic bags to be offered by food service operators. In February 2018, Taiwan announced plans to ban plastic bags in varying degrees, banned for in-store use by 2019, certain stores prohibited from offering bags by 2020, price increases starting 2025, then 2030 blanket ban of single-use plastic bags, as well as single-use utensils and containers.

=== Thailand ===
Thailand banned all free single-use plastics in 2020, including plastic bags.

=== Europe ===
==== European Union ====
In November 2013, the European Commission published a proposal aiming to reduce the consumption of lightweight (thickness below 50 microns) plastic carrier bags. Under the proposal, EU member states can choose the most appropriate measures to discourage the use of plastic bags.

On 29 April 2015 the European Parliament passed Directive 2015/720, aiming to reduce plastic bag use by 50% by 2017 and 80% by 2019.

==== Denmark ====
In 2003, Denmark introduced a tax on retailers giving out plastic bags. This encouraged stores to charge for plastic bags and pushed the use of reusable bags. It was thought that this saved about 66% of plastic and paper bags. In 2004, a similar law was passed by the Inatsisartut in Greenland, which applied a recycling tax on plastic bags. By 2014 Denmark had the lowest plastic bag use in Europe, with 4 bags per person per year, compared to 466 in Portugal, Poland and Slovakia.

==== Germany ====
The German Packaging Act was introduced on 1 January 2019, limiting the number of disposable plastic bags used for packaging. Companies planning to use these materials are now required to register with the government before distributing their products. If they do not comply, they can be fined up to €200,000 and banned from selling their products. The amendment also established recycling quotas that markets must meet to avoid being fined. In 2019, 36% of plastic bags used for packaging were required to be recycled, but this percentage was increased to 63% in 2022. An amendment to the Packaging Act was introduced on 9 February 2021, banning all single-use plastic, including shopping bags, from 1 January 2022.

==== Greece ====
Prior to the introduction of a charge on plastic bags, Greece produced roughly 4 billion single-use plastic bags every year. Though the average person in Greece disposed of over 300 plastic bags annually, only 10% of these were recycled. A plastic bag charge was introduced on 1 January 2018, initially of 4 cents per bag, then increased to 7 cents on 1 January 2019. Greece passed further legislation to discourage use of single-use plastics on 1 July 2021, including a ban on merchants from ordering and selling single-use plastic bags and serviceware.

==== Ireland ====
Ireland introduced a €0.15 tax in March 2002. Levied on consumers at the point of sale, this led to 90% of consumers using long-life bags within a year. This tax geared to change the behavior of consumers while still allowing them to choose if they want to pay an extra fee for plastic bags. The tax was increased to €0.22 in 2007. The revenue is put into an Environment Fund, which is to be used for environmental projects; this is a major reason that consumers support this tax. A study was done to look at how consumers responded to the tax at checkout and 60% were neutral over the cost while 14% of respondent were "positive" to the extra charge and 26% responded negatively.

==== Moldova ====
The Moldovan parliament passed legislation gradually beginning the phase-out of plastic bags from January 2019, with a full ban coming into force from 1 January 2021.

==== Netherlands ====
The Netherlands implemented a comprehensive ban on free plastic shopping bags on 1 January 2016. The ban has a small number of exemptions for unpacked food products which are exposed to possible contamination, such as fresh fruit. The target price for a plastic bag is €0.25.

==== Poland ====
A plastic recycling levy was introduced on 1 January 2018. Single-use plastic bags cost a minimum of 0.25zł (inclusive of VAT), however stores are able to charge a higher amount. The Polish government estimated that the levy would bring 1.1 billion złoty to the state budget in 2018, in addition to approx. 250 million złoty of VAT revenue raised on sales of the bags.

==== Portugal ====
Portugal implemented a plastic bag tax amounting to 10 cents (€) on single-use carrier bags, which led to a reduction of 90% in their use. However, many retailers started selling thicker (reusable) plastic bags, which are not subject to the tax, for the same amount. Before the Portuguese government implemented this plastic bag tax, some supermarkets in Portugal had already implemented a 2 cent (€) fee on each plastic bag. In Madeira Island where supermarkets implemented this bag fee, there was a 64% reduction in plastic bag consumption.

Portugal banned plastic bags entirely in 2021.

==== Romania ====
A law was introduced in 2006 (law 578/2006) – and was later modified in 2011 (law 1032/2011) – that put a mandatory tax on non-biodegradable plastic bags. A modification in 2011 reduced the tax on plastic bags and was regarded by some as a step backwards from environmental protection. Lightweight plastic bags were banned on 1 January 2019.

==== Serbia ====
Serbia has a tax on manufacturers and importers of plastic bags and plans to introduce a ban on lightweight plastic bags and a charge on biodegradable bags in order to reduce bag use to under 90 per person by 2019. Major supermarkets began charging 2 dinars per bag in 2018.

==== Spain ====
Spain introduced a plastic bag charge on 1 July 2018. Catalonia has had a bag charge since April 2017.

==== Switzerland ====
In 2016, the two largest chains of supermarkets in Switzerland, the Federation of Migros Cooperatives and Coop, announced that they will progressively stop to distribute free plastic bags (at the check-out). Both distributors announced that they will not make money with paid bags, but that profits from their sale will be invested in environmental projects.

Migros previously tested the measure in the canton of Vaud since 2013: they reduced the number of plastic bags distributed by ninety percent (and saved 100,000 francs per year). Migros will be the first to introduce the measure across the country, on 1 November 2016 (the bags will be made with recycled plastic and cost 0.05 Swiss francs each). Coop plans to introduce this in 2017.

==== United Kingdom ====
The Climate Change Act 2008 served as the legislative framework for the regulation of plastic bags in the United Kingdom. In July 2022, it was reported that plastic bag usage among the main retailers in the UK had declined 97% since 2014, with a great share of the decline occurring after the 5p charge was introduced in 2015.

===== Wales =====
Wales introduced a legal minimum charge of 5 pence for almost all single use bags in October 2011. Paper and biodegradable bags are included in the charge as well as plastic bags, with only a few specific exemptions – such as for unpackaged food or medicine supplied on an NHS prescription. VAT raised from the charge is collected by the government. Retailers are asked to pass the rest of the proceeds on to charities. July 2012 statistics released by the Welsh Government suggested that carrier bag use in Wales had reduced 96% since the introduction of the charge.

===== Northern Ireland =====
Northern Ireland introduced a 5 pence levy on almost all single use bags on 8 April 2013. The levy was extended to reusable carrier bags with a retail price of less than 20 pence from 19 January 2014 as data from a number of retailers indicated that reusable bag sales had increased by 800% since the introduction of the levy on single use bags. The proceeds of the levy (£4.17m in 2013/14) are paid to the Department of the Environment and used to fund local environmental projects and enforce the levy. Official statistics for the Northern Ireland levy show that the number of single use bags dispensed fell from around 300 million in 2012/13 to 84.5 million in 2013/14 – a reduction of 72%.

===== Scotland =====
A five pence minimum charge for single-use carrier bags came into force in Scotland on 20 October 2014. This was enacted as a statutory instrument under the Climate Change (Scotland) Act 2009, rather than a UK wide act. The proceeds of the charge can be used by the retailers as they see fit, although retailers are encouraged to pledge to donate proceeds to "good causes". The charge is not exclusive to plastic bags, and includes biodegradable bags, such as paper. Bags for unpackaged food, loose seeds, soil-contaminated goods, axes, knives or blades; drugs or medical appliances; small packaged uncooked fish, meat or poultry; aquatic animals; purchases made in aerodrome security restricted areas; or goods bought on board a ship, train, aircraft, coach or bus are exempt from the charge.

===== England =====
England was the last country in the United Kingdom to adopt the 5 pence charge, with the levy taking effect on 5 October 2015. Prior to the introduction of plastic bag regulations, various retailers participated in voluntary actions to reduce plastic bag consumption.

Unlike the rest of the UK, the English charge does not apply to paper bags or bags made from other natural materials. As with the other nations, VAT raised on sales will be collected by the Government. Retailers can choose how the money raised from bag sales is used. The Government publishes information yearly on the scheme, encouraging retailers to donate the proceeds to charities.

In the first 6 months, 640 million plastic bags were used in seven major supermarkets in England, raising £29.2 million for good causes. England reported to have distributed 0.6 billion single-use bags during the first half year of the charge, 7 billion fewer than were distributed in 2014. A longitudinal evaluation of the English Plastic Bag Charge found that the charge had a positive effect upon all demographic groups, with a reduction in single-use plastic bags found among all income groups, all age groups, and both men and women. In addition, the study found that public support for the plastic bag charge increased just one month after it was introduced, and people who increased their support for the bag charge were also more likely to increase their support for other policies aimed at reducing plastic waste, suggesting a 'spillover' effect for policy support.

Retailers with fewer than 250 employees were initially exempt from the charge. Opponents of this exemption argued that it would reduce the environmental impact of the charge. In response to this criticism, in the UK government announced plans to extend the charge to all retailers and double it to 10p, which was expected to come into effect in April 2021. The 10p plastic bag charge went into effect for all businesses in England on 21 May 2021.

There is no requirement to charge for:

- Exempt bags
  - Woven plastic bags
  - "Bags for life" that are sold for 10p or more
- Bags used only to contain these items:
  - Food and plants
    - Uncooked fish
    - Uncooked meat and poultry
    - Unwrapped food for human or animal consumption
    - Unwrapped loose seeds
    - Flowers
    - Bulbs, corms, or rhizomes
    - Goods contaminated by soil
  - Specified products
    - Unwrapped blades
    - Prescription medicines
  - Live fish or aquatic creatures
  - Alcohol or tobacco sold airside at an airport, where the bag is sealed at purchase
- Bags considered to be sealed packaging for mail orders or click and collect
- Bags containing free promotional material
- Plastic bags supplied in the course of a service where no goods are sold, such as dry cleaning

=== North America ===
==== The Bahamas ====
The Bahamian government banned single-use plastics (including light-weight plastic bags) in 2020, following a campaign by the Bahamas Plastic Movement (BPM), an environmental non-profit organization, which used citizen science-based research, public education and youth campaigns to lobby the government.

==== Canada ====
In March 2007, the small town of Leaf Rapids, Manitoba, became the first community in North America to ban bags.

The Toronto City Council voted on 6 June 2012, to ban plastic bags effective 1 January 2013, and to scrap the city's five-cent bag fee starting 1 July 2012. Industry groups have convinced city officials to include a grace period between 1 January 2013, and 30 June 2013, when no fines, only warnings, can be issued. The bag ban and five cent fee (six cents with HST) have both been overturned as of 28 November 2012 and it's up to individual retailers if they want to charge for plastic bags. Most stores, with the exception of a few national retailers do not charge.

The Canadian government planned to ban single-use plastics in 2021, including plastic straws, cotton swabs, stirrers, plates, cutlery, and balloon sticks. Implementation of the ban was postponed to 20 December 2022 due to the COVID-19 pandemic.

Local laws governing plastic bag use in Canada
Province/Territory	Municipality	Passage date	Effective date	Effect
Alberta	Regional Municipality of Wood Buffalo	10 April 2010	10 September 2010	Single-use plastic shopping bag ban. Reusable bags must be at least 2.25 mils.
British Columbia	Victoria	17 December 2017	1 July 2018	Single-use plastic shopping bag ban.
Manitoba
Manitoba	Leaf Rapids	22 March 2007	2 April 2007	Single-use plastic shopping bag ban.
Manitoba	Thompson	27 September 2010	31 December 2010	Single-use polyethylene bag ban. Reusable bags must be 2.25 mils thick.
New Brunswick
New Brunswick	Dieppe	10 June 2019	1 October 2020	Single-use plastic shopping bag ban.
New Brunswick	Moncton		1 October 2020	Single-use plastic shopping bag ban.
New Brunswick	Riverview	10 June 2019	1 October 2020	Single-use plastic shopping bag ban.
Newfoundland and Labrador	Province-wide	9 April 2019	1 October 2020	Single-use plastic shopping bag ban.
Northwest Territories	Territory-wide		1 February 2011	Single-use plastic shopping bag charge of 25c.
Nova Scotia	Province-wide	30 October 2019	30 October 2020	Single-use plastic shopping bag ban.
Nunavut	Baker Lake	3 June 2021	3 June 2021	Single-use plastic shopping bag ban.
Prince Edward Island	Province-wide		July 2019	Single-use plastic shopping bag ban.
Quebec
Quebec	Brossard	16 February 2016	1 September 2016	Single-use plastic bag ban (including compostable)
Quebec	Deux-Montagnes	2009		Plastic bag ban
Quebec	Huntingdon	2008		Plastic bag ban including bags used for newspapers and flyers
Quebec	Montreal	23 August 2016	1 January 2018	Ban of plastic bags including biodegradable. Reusable bags must be at least 50 microns thickness.
Saskatchewan	Regina	31 May 2020	1 February 2022	Single-use plastic shopping bag ban effective following COVID-19 pandemic.
Yukon
Yukon	Province-wide		1 January 2022	Single-use plastic shopping bag ban.
Yukon	Carmacks		1 August 2019	Single-use plastic shopping bag ban.

==== Guatemala ====
A few municipalities in Guatemala have banned plastic bags, including San Pedro La Laguna, Acatenango, Villa Canales, San Miguel Petapa and Totonicapán.

==== Jamaica ====
On 17 September 2018, the Jamaican Cabinet announced a total ban on the importation, manufacture, distribution and use of single-use plastic bags, effective 1 January 2019. The policy came in response to problems of improper disposal leading to drain clogging and expensive clean-up efforts. They phased single use plastic bags in waves, the most recent of which took effect 1 January 2021.

==== Mexico ====
Plastic bags are banned in the following states: Baja California, Mexico City, Colima, Durango, Hidalgo, Michoacán, Morelos, Nayarit, Nuevo León, Oaxaca, Querétaro, Quintana Roo, Sonora, Tabasco, Veracruz, Yucatán and Zacatecas.

==== Panama ====
Panama's Assembly has passed legislation banning plastic bags. The law was passed in 2018 and came into force on 20 July 2019, while wholesalers had until January 2020 to phase out their existing stock.

==== United States ====
Phase out of lightweight plastic bags in the United States (laws in GU, ME, NY, VT passed but not in effect yet not shown on map): Plastic bags banned A charge on some plastic bags Partial charge or ban (county or municipality level)

There is no national plastic bag fee or ban currently in effect in the United States. However, the states of California, Connecticut (July 2021), Delaware (2021), Hawaii (de facto), Maine (January 2021), New Jersey (May 2022), New York, Oregon, Vermont (July 2020) and Washington (2021) and the territories of American Samoa, Guam (2021), Northern Mariana Islands, US Virgin Islands and Puerto Rico have banned disposable bags. By September 2018, about 350 counties and municipalities had enacted ordinances either imposing a fee on plastic bags or banning them outright, including all counties in Hawaii. Other attempts at banning plastic shopping bags statewide (for example in Massachusetts, though as of August 2019, 122 cities and towns in the state have done so)) have not succeeded mainly due to plastic industry lobbying. A few jurisdictions have chosen to implement a fee-only approach to bag reduction such as Connecticut, Washington, D.C. and adjacent Montgomery County, Maryland. Some US states, such as Florida and Arizona, have passed laws preventing local municipalities from passing their own bans.

The California Senate passed Senate Bill 270 in 2014 that banned the free single-use plastic bags available at grocery stores. This ban specified that plastic bags available at grocery stores must be 2.25 millimeters thick, contain at least 40% recycled materials, and be recyclable within California. This bill was passed with timeframes for progressively tighter restrictions. Violations are punishable by fines. In September 2024, Governor Gavin Newsom signed a bill banning all plastic bags statewide from 2026.

=== Oceania ===
==== Australia ====
Although there is no nationwide ban on lightweight bags, they are banned in all states and territories. Coles Bay, Tasmania was the first location in Australia to ban lightweight plastic bags. The introduction of the "Zero Waste" program in South Australia led to its lightweight bag ban in October 2008. It is estimated that 400 million bags are saved each year. Western Australia and Queensland banned them in July 2018 and Victoria introduced a ban in November 2019. Bans in the Australian Capital Territory, South Australia, Northern Territory, Tasmania allow lightweight bags that are biodegradable.

In Australia, 6 billion HDPE bags were used in 2002. Usage reduced to 5.6 billion in 2004, and 3.9 billion in 2007.

After the two biggest supermarket chains in Australia banned single-use plastic grocery bags, the consumption of plastic bags in Australia dropped by 80% in three months.

==== New Zealand ====
In 2018, the Labour government pledged to phase out single-use plastic bags within a year's time. New Zealand is one of the highest producers of urban waste in the developed world, per capita, according to OECD data. Prime Minister Jacinda Ardern and Associate Environment Minister Eugenie Sage made the announcement on 10 August 2018. On 18 December 2018, the Labour Government announced that all plastic shopping bags, including biodegradable, compostable, and oxy-gradable bags, that have handles with a thickness of less than 70 microns, will be banned from 1 July 2019. Retailers who do not comply could face fines of up to NZD$100,000 (£51,000).

Since 1 October 2022, PVC food trays, polystyrene takeaway and drink packaging, expanded polystyrene food and drink packaging, plastic with pro-degradent additives, plastic drink stirrers and plastic stemmed cotton buds have been banned. On 1 July 2023, plastic produce bags; plastic plates, bowls and cutlery; plastic straws (except for medical reasons) and plastic produce labels were banned.

==== Vanuatu ====
On 1 July 2018, Vanuatu banned single use plastic bags and polystyrene take-away boxes. Simultaneously, Vanuatu also became the world's first country to ban the sale and usage of disposable plastic drinking straws. The campaign to ban plastic bags and straws was championed by First Lady Estella Moses Tallis and government officials.

=== South America ===
==== Argentina ====
In 2012, the Buenos Aires city government allowed supermarkets to charge for plastic bags in order to discourage their use, which is said to have reduced their use by 50%. In 2016 the city announced a full ban on the distribution of plastic bags in supermarkets and hypermarkets, commencing 1 January 2017.

In 2009 the Governor of Buenos Aires Province, Daniel Scioli, approved Law 13868, which mandated that by the end of that year, all non-biodegradable plastic bags should be phased out in favour of degradable materials.

Other provinces like Neuquén, Chubut, Río Negro and cities like Rosario, Villa Gesell or Bariloche had already banned the distribution of plastic bags in supermarkets as well.

==== Chile ====
In May 2018, the House of Representatives voted for a gradual phaseout of plastic bags from retailers nationwide. In August 2018, the legislation was approved by Congress and the President, making Chile the first Latin American country to ban plastic bags. Beginning on 3 August 2018, each purchase could be accompanied by no more than two plastic bags. Under the legislation, six months later, supermarkets and large retail businesses were not permitted to provide plastic bags at all, and on 3 August 2020 the total ban also began to apply to small businesses. Environment minister Carolina Schmidt said it is believed that the law eliminated the use of billions of plastic bags.

Before the nationwide ban, similar rules existed regionally. As of 2017, some 80 municipalities already restricted plastic bag distribution, while some coastal and lakeside areas had banned plastic bags altogether.

==== Colombia ====
As of 2015, Colombia planned to reduce the use of plastic bags by 80% by the year 2020 and to eliminate their use by the year 2025. On 29 April 2016, the Ministry of Environment passed a resolution banning plastic bags under 30 cm by 30 cm.

From 1 July 2017, the Colombian Government applies a tax of 20 pesos per plastic bag, with a planned annual increase of 10 pesos per bag until 2020.

A challenge has been the single-use plastic that accompanies grocery and restaurant delivery; these services were in high demand during the 2020 coronavirus pandemic.

==== Uruguay ====
In 2018, the Uruguayan Parliament approved the law N^{o}19655 that banned the production, importation and commercialization of all non-biodegradable single-use plastic bags throughout the country. Since 1 July 2019 only biodegradable bags are allowed for commercial use, with a tax of 4 pesos per bag. According to government agencies, just days after the law was approved, the use of plastic bags dropped by 80%, marking a huge success for the regulation.

== See also ==
- Biodegradable bag
- Disposable food packaging bans and charges
- Phase-out of fossil fuel vehicles
- Incandescent light bulb ban
- Phase-out of polystyrene foam
- Sustainability
- Waste management
- Reusable shopping bag
