= Plastic bag bans in the United States =

Phase out of lightweight plastic products in the United States Plastic bags banned A charge on some plastic bags Partial charge or ban (county or municipality level) Bans preempted by state law or court order

There is no national plastic bag fee or ban currently in effect in the United States. However, the states of California, Colorado, Connecticut, Delaware, Hawaii (de facto), Maine, New Jersey, New York, Oregon, Rhode Island, Vermont and Washington and the territories of American Samoa, Guam, Northern Mariana Islands, United States Virgin Islands and Puerto Rico have banned disposable bags. Over 200 counties and municipalities have enacted ordinances either imposing a fee on plastic bags or banning them outright, including all counties in Hawaii.

Some attempts at banning plastic shopping bags statewide (for example in Massachusetts, though as of May 2023, 162 of the 301 cities and towns in the state have done so) have not succeeded mainly due to plastic industry lobbying. A few jurisdictions have chosen to implement a fee-only approach to bag reduction such as Chicago, Washington, D.C. and certain counties and independent cities in Virginia. Some states, such as Florida, Arizona, and Missouri, have passed laws preventing local municipalities from passing their own bans. Some retailers have stopped using plastic bags ahead of government mandates.

== Summary of plastic bag laws ==
(Law no longer in effect)

Local laws governing plastic bag use in the United States
State/Territory	Jurisdiction	Passage date	Effective date	Effect
Alaska	City-Borough of Anchorage	August 2018	September 2019	Plastic bag ban, 10 cent charge for paper bags. (Note: People who use SNAP benefits are excluded from the charge.)
Alaska	City of Bethel	July 2009	September 2010	Plastic bag ban.
Alaska	City of Cordova	September 2014	November 2015	Plastic bag ban; bags are banned under 2.25 mils.
Alaska	City of Dillingham		December 31, 2020	Plastic bag ban.
Alaska	City of Homer	August 2012	January 2013	Plastic bag ban.
Alaska	City of Hooper Bay		August 2010	Plastic bag ban.
Alaska	City of Kodiak	January 2018	April 2018	Plastic bag ban.
Alaska	City of Palmer	May 2018	January 2019	Plastic bag ban.
Alaska	City of Wasilla	January 2018	July 2018	Plastic bag ban.
Alaska	City of Unalaska	August 2018	January 2019	Plastic bag ban
American Samoa	Territory-wide	January 2010	February 2011	Plastic bag ban for all wholesale and retail businesses.
California	Statewide	September 2014	November 2016	Plastic bag ban,10 cent charge for paper or reusable plastic* bags. A complete ban on retail plastic bags, regardless of thickness, went into effect on January 1, 2026. Restaurants are exempt from the ban on plastic bags. All local ordinances, listed below, supersede this legislation.
Colorado	Statewide	July 2021	January 2024	Plastic bag ban for large retailers; 10 cent charge for paper bags. A higher fee may be adopted by the municipality or county in which the store is located.
Colorado	City of Aspen	October 2011	May 2012	Plastic bag ban for large retailers; 20 cent charge for paper bags.
Colorado	Town of Avon		May 1, 2018	Plastic bag ban; 10 cent tax on paper bags.
Colorado	City of Boulder	November 2012	July 2013	Plastic bag ban; 10 cent charge for paper bags.
Colorado	City of Carbondale	October 2011	May 2012	Plastic bag ban for large retailers; 20 cent charge for paper bags.
Colorado	Town of Crested Butte	August 15, 2016	September 1, 2018	Plastic bag ban. Paper bags must contain at least 40% post-consumer recycled paper content.
Colorado	City of Denver	December 2019	July 1, 2020	10 cent charge.
Colorado	City of Fort Collins	April 7, 2021	May 1, 2022	Plastic bag ban at grocers with more than 10,000 square feet.
Colorado	Town of Ridgway	December 12, 2018	March 1, 2019	Plastic bag ban; bags are banned under 2.25 mils.
Colorado	Town of Telluride	October 2010	March 2011	Plastic bag ban; 10 cent charge for paper bags.
Connecticut	Statewide		July 1, 2021	Plastic bag ban.
Connecticut	Town of Greenwich	March 12, 2018	September 2018	Plastic bag ban. Sunsets in 3 years. Paper bags must contain 40% post-consumer content and no old-growth fiber.
Connecticut	Town of Norwalk	January 8, 2018	July 8, 2018	Plastic bag ban.
Connecticut	Town of Westport	September 2008	March 2009	Plastic bag ban. Defines acceptable "recyclable paper bag" alternatives.
Delaware	Statewide	July 29, 2019	January 1, 2021	Plastic bag ban applies to large stores (7,000 square feet or larger) and chains with 3 stores each larger than 3,000 square feet. Paper and reusable bags have a 10¢ fee. Compostable bags allowed.
(Washington, D.C.) District of Columbia	District-wide	June 2009	August 2009	Minimum 5 cent fee for plastic bags.
(Georgia (U.S. state)) Georgia	City of South Fulton	October 2019	March 1, 2021	Single-use plastic bag ban.
Guam	Territory-wide	June 5, 2018	January 1, 2021	Plastic bag ban.
(Hawaii) Hawaii^{1}
(Hawaii) Hawaii^{1}	Hawaii County	December 2011	January 2013	Ban on compostable and non-compostable plastic checkout bags. Allows plastic bags at least 3 mils.
(Hawaii) Hawaii^{1}	Honolulu City and County	2014	July 2015	Bill 10 in 2010 banned some plastic checkout bags but allowed biodegradable bags. Bill 38 in 2014 banned biodegradable plastic checkout bags but allowed compostable plastic bags. Plastic bags still allowed for carrying food and drinks, plastic bags at least 2.25 mils allowed.
(Hawaii) Hawaii^{1}	Kauaʻi County	October 2009	January 2011	Ban on plastic checkout bags made with fossil fuels. Biodegradable bags allowed.
(Hawaii) Hawaii^{1}	Maui County	August 2008	January 2011	Ban on compostable and non-compostable plastic checkout bags. Allows plastic bags at least 3 mils.
Illinois
Illinois	City of Batavia	November 21, 2022	July 1, 2023	10-cent fee on single-use plastic and paper bags in stores with at least 5,000 square feet. No fees for bags used to package bulk items, produce, or for prescription drugs. There are some other exceptions.
Illinois	Chicago	November 2016	February 1, 2017	Plastic and paper bags from retailers are taxed 15-cents per bag. Tax does not apply to bags with a retail price of at least 50¢. Chicago repealed the ban it had passed April 30, 2014, that went into effect starting August 1, 2015. Reusable bags were defined as being at least 2.25 mils. The bag tax was initially 7-cents before being raised to the 10-cent tax on January 1, 2025. It was raised again to 15 cents on January 1, 2026.
Illinois	City of Edwardsville	April 1, 2020	July 12, 2021	10-cent fee on single-use plastic and paper bags in stores with at least 7000 square feet.
Illinois	City of Elgin	March 11, 2026	June 1, 2027	Ban on single-use plastic bags at applicable retail establishments. 10-cent fee for paper bags. Restaurants, gas stations, pop-ups, and small non-chain stores are exempt from the ban.
Illinois	City of Evanston	May 22, 2023	August 1, 2023	Ban on single-use plastic bags in all retail stores with at least 10,000 square feet, except for produce bags made of compostable plastic; $0.10 tax on remaining bag types at large retail stores, with some exceptions. Original ban (enacted July 28, 2014, effective August 1, 2015): Bans plastic bags less than 2.25 mils at chain and franchise stores over 10,000 square feet. Biodegradable bags allowed.
Illinois	Village of Northbrook	February 2023	January 1, 2024	10-cent fee on single-use plastic and paper bags in stores with at least 3,000 square feet. No fees for bags used to package bulk items, produce, or for prescription drugs; and for bags used by food assistance program participants.
Illinois	Village of Oak Park	August 7, 2017	July 1, 2018	10-cent fee on single-use plastic and paper bags in stores with at least 5000 square feet.
Illinois	City of Park Ridge	March 18, 2026	January 1, 2027	Ban on non-paper single-use bags in all stores with at least 7500 square feet. All paper point-of-sale bags in all retail establishments must be recyclable.
Illinois	City of Woodstock	September 17, 2019	January 1, 2020	10-cent fee on single-use plastic and paper bags in stores with at least 5000 square feet.
Kansas	City of Lawrence	August 8, 2023	March 1, 2024	Single-use plastic bag ban.
Maine	Statewide	June 17, 2019	July 1, 2021	Plastic bags under 4 mils thick banned. Paper bags have a 5¢ fee.
Maine	Town of Falmouth	January 2016	April 1, 2016	5-cent fee for single-use plastic (and paper) bags at stores greater than 10,000 square feet. Reusable plastic bags must be at least 4 mils.
Maine	City of Portland	June 2014	April 15, 2015	5-cent fee for single-use plastic (and paper) bags at pharmacies, and food and convenience stores, which is kept by the store.
Maine	City of South Portland	September 2015	March 1, 2016	5-cent fee for single-use plastic (and paper) bags at pharmacies, and food and convenience stores, which is kept by the store. Reusable plastic bags must be at least 2.25 mils.
Maine	Town of York	November 3, 2015	March 3, 2016	Plastic bag ban. Reusable plastic bags must be at least 3 mils.
Maryland	City of Annapolis	July 22, 2024	January 22, 2025	Single-use plastic bag ban. $0.10 fee for paper bags.
Maryland	Anne Arundel County (unincorporated)	June 5, 2023	January 1, 2024	Plastic bag ban. Paper bags will have a $0.10 fee after February 1, 2024.
Maryland	City of Baltimore	January 13, 2020	October 1, 2021	Plastic bag ban. Paper and other non-plastic bags have a five-cent fee.
Maryland	Baltimore County	February 6, 2023	November 1, 2023	Plastic Bag Ban. 5 cent fee for paper bags.
Maryland	Town of Centreville	July 19, 2023	January 1, 2024	Single-use plastic bag ban. $0.10 fee for paper or reusable bags.
Maryland	Town of Chestertown	April 4, 2011	January 2012	Plastic bag ban. Reusable plastic bags must be at least 2.25 mils.
Maryland	City of College Park	February 14, 2023	September 1, 2023	Plastic bag ban. 10 cent fee for other bags.
Maryland	Town of Easton	September 13, 2022	April 2, 2023	Plastic bag ban. Paper bags to cost $0.10.
Maryland	City of Frederick	May 4, 2023	January 1, 2024	Plastic bag ban. No fee for paper bags.
Maryland	Howard County	February 5, 2020	October 1, 2020	5 cent fee for plastic bags.
Maryland	City of Laurel	June 28, 2021	January 1, 2022	Plastic Bag Ban.
Maryland	Montgomery County	May 2011	January 2012	Minimum 5 cent fee for plastic bags. Repealed as part of the "Bring your Own Bag" bill passed in February 2025.
Maryland	Montgomery County	February 11, 2025	January 1, 2026	Plastic bag ban.
Maryland	Prince George's County	June 20, 2023	January 1, 2024	Plastic bag and plastic straw ban.
Maryland	City of Rockville	November 10, 2025	January 1, 2026	Plastic bag ban.
Maryland	City of Salisbury	November 14, 2022	July 1, 2023	Plastic bag ban.
Maryland	City of Westminster	May 2019	January 1, 2020	Plastic bag ban.
Maryland	City of Takoma Park	July 27, 2016	December 1, 2016	Plastic bag ban.
Massachusetts
Massachusetts	Town of Abington	May 20, 2019	November 20, 2020	Plastic bag ban. Reusable bags must be at least 5 mils.
Massachusetts	Town of Adams	June 20, 2016	March 30, 2017	Plastic bag ban. Reusable bags must be at least 2.5 mils.
Massachusetts	City of Amesbury	March 12, 2019	September 12, 2019	Plastic bag ban. Reusable bags must be at least 3 mils.
Massachusetts	Town of Amherst	May 3, 2016	January 1, 2017	Plastic bag ban. Reusable bags must be at least 3 mils.
Massachusetts	Town of Andover	May 2, 2018	January 2, 2019	Plastic bag ban. Reusable bags must be at least 4 mils and if plastic must be made of polypropylene or polyester.
Massachusetts	Town of Aquinnah	May 10, 2016	January 1, 2017	Plastic bag ban. Reusable bags must be at least 4 mils.
Massachusetts	Town of Arlington	April 26, 2017	March 1, 2018 (large stores)	Plastic bag ban. Reusable bags must be at least 4 mils. Paper bags must contain at least 40% post-consumer recycled paper content.
Massachusetts	Town of Arlington	April 26, 2017	July 1, 2018 (for all stores)	Plastic bag ban. Reusable bags must be at least 4 mils. Paper bags must contain at least 40% post-consumer recycled paper content.
Massachusetts	Town of Auburn	October 7, 2019	March 2020	Plastic bag ban. Reusable bags must be at least 4 mils. Paper bags must contain at least 40% post-consumer recycled paper content.
Massachusetts	Town of Barnstable	September 3, 2015	September 2016	Plastic bag ban. Reusable bags must be at least 3 mils.
Massachusetts	Town of Bedford	March 27, 2017	October 1, 2017	Plastic bag ban. Reusable bags must be at least 2.5 mils.
Massachusetts	Town of Belmont	July 16, 2018	April 17, 2019	Plastic bag ban. Reusable bags must be at least 4.0 mils. Paper bags must contain at least 40% post-consumer recycled paper content.
Massachusetts	City of Beverly	June 18, 2018	January 1, 2019	Plastic bag ban. Reusable bags must be more than 4 mils. Paper bags must contain at least 40% post-consumer recycled paper content.
Massachusetts	City of Boston	December 17, 2017	December 2018	Plastic bag ban. Reusable bags must be at least 3 mils. Paper bags must contain at least 40% post-consumer recycled paper content. Fee of 5¢ on single-use bags. Compostable plastic bags allowed.
Massachusetts	Town of Bridgewater	March 8, 2016	September 2016	Plastic bag ban for chain and larger stores (basically 3000 square feet). Reusable bags must be at least 2.5 mils.
Massachusetts	Town of Brookline	November 2012	December 1, 2013	Non-compostable plastic shopping bag ban, and produce bags (as amended May, 2025). Reusable bags must be at least 4 mils (as amended on November 15, 2016). Paper bags must contain at least 40% post-consumer recycled paper content.
Massachusetts	Town of Burlington	January 28, 2019	June 28, 2019	Plastic shopping bag ban. Reusable bags cannot be made of polyethylene or polyvinyl chloride, and must be more than 3 mils thick. Paper bags must contain at least 40% post-consumer recycled paper content.
Massachusetts	City of Cambridge	March 30, 2015	March 31, 2016	Plastic bag ban. Reusable bags must be at least 3 mils. Paper bags must contain at least 40% post-consumer recycled paper content. Fee of 10¢ on single-use bags. Compostable plastic bags allowed.
Massachusetts	Town of Chatham	November 16, 2015	January 1, 2017	Plastic bag ban. Reusable bags must be at least 2.5 mils.
Massachusetts	City of Chicopee	October 1, 2024	June 1, 2025	Retail plastic bag ban.
Massachusetts	Town of Chilmark	April 25, 2016	January 1, 2017	Plastic bag ban. Reusable bags must be at least 4 mils. Paper bags must contain at least 40% post-consumer recycled paper content.
Massachusetts	Town of Cohasset	April 30, 2018	November 1, 2018	Non-biodegradable plastic shopping bag ban. Reusable bags cannot be made of polyethylene or polyvinyl chloride, and must be more than 4 mils thick. Paper bags must contain at least 40% post-consumer recycled paper content.
Massachusetts	Town of Concord	April 2015	January 1, 2016	Plastic bag ban. Reusable bags must be at least 2.5 mils.
Massachusetts	Town of Dartmouth	June 5, 2018	late 2019	Plastic bag ban. Reusable bags must be at least 1 mil.
Massachusetts	Town of Duxbury	March 13, 2017	2018	Plastic bag ban. Reusable bags must be at least 3 mils.
Massachusetts	Town of Easton	November 12, 2019	June 2020	Plastic bag ban. Reusable bags cannot be made of polyethylene or polyvinyl chloride, and must be at least 4 mils thick.
Massachusetts	Town of Eastham	May 6, 2019	January 1, 2020	Plastic bag ban.
Massachusetts	Town of Edgartown	April 12, 2016	January 1, 2017	Plastic bag ban. Reusable bags must be at least 4 mils.
Massachusetts	Town of Fairhaven	May 6, 2023	January 1, 2024	Thin-film plastic bag ban.
Massachusetts	Town of Falmouth	November 2014	May 2016	Plastic bag ban. Reusable bags must be at least 2.5 mils.
Massachusetts	Town of Framingham	May 12, 2016	January 1, 2018	Plastic bag ban. Reusable bags must be at least 2.5 mils.
Massachusetts	Town of Franklin	February 12, 2020	July 1, 2020	Plastic bag ban. Reusable bags must have stitched handles and cannot made of polyethylene or polyvinyl chloride. Paper bags must contain at least 40% post-consumer recycled paper content.
Massachusetts	Town of Georgetown	May 7, 2018	September 2019	Plastic bag ban. Reusable bags must be more than 2.5 mils.
Massachusetts	City of Gloucester	November 14, 2017	January 1, 2019	Plastic bag ban. Paper bags must contain at least 40% post-consumer recycled paper content. Reusable bags cannot be made of polyethylene or polyvinyl chloride, and must be more than 2.25 mils.
Massachusetts	Town of Grafton	May 2017	July 1, 2018	Plastic bag ban. Paper bags must contain at least 40% post-consumer recycled paper content.
Massachusetts	Town of Great Barrington	May 2013	2013	Plastic bag ban. Reusable bags must be at least 2.5 mils.
Massachusetts	City of Greenfield	January 16, 2019	January 2020	Plastic bag ban. Fee of 5¢ on paper bags goes into effect in January 2021.
Massachusetts	Town of Hadley	May 5, 2022	January 1, 2023	Single-use plastic bag ban.
Massachusetts	Town of Hamilton	April 11, 2015	July 27, 2016	Non-biodegradable plastic bag ban. Reusable bags must be at least 3 mils.
Massachusetts	Town of Hanson	October 7, 2019	June 1, 2020	Plastic bag ban. Paper bags must contain at least 20% or 40% post-consumer recycled paper content.
Massachusetts	Town of Harwich	May 4, 2015	May 2016	Plastic bag ban. Reusable bags must be at least 2.5 mils.
Massachusetts	City of Haverhill	August 7, 2018	January 7, 2019	Plastic bag ban. Reusable bags must be at least 3 mils. Paper bags must contain at least 40% post-consumer recycled paper content.
Massachusetts	Town of Hudson	November 18, 2019	June 1, 2020	Plastic bag ban. Paper bags must contain at least 20% or 40% post-consumer recycled paper content. Reusable plastic bags cannot be made of polyethylene or polyvinyl chloride.
Massachusetts	Town of Hull	May 6, 2019	January 1, 2020	Plastic bag ban. Paper bags must contain at least 40% post-consumer recycled paper content.
Massachusetts	Town of Ipswich	May 10, 2016	c. August 2017	Plastic bag ban. Reusable bags must be at least 3 mils.
Massachusetts	Town of Lee	May 10, 2016	May 10, 2017	Plastic bag ban including produce bags. Reusable plastic bags must be at least 4 mils. Paper bags must contain at least 40% post-consumer recycled paper content.
Massachusetts	Town of Lenox	June 9, 2016	June 9, 2017	Plastic bag ban. Reusable plastic bags must be at least 4 mils. Paper bags must contain at least 40% post-consumer recycled paper content.
Massachusetts	Town of Lexington	March 27, 2018	January 1, 2019	Plastic bag ban. Reusable plastic bags must be at least 2.25 mils.
Massachusetts	Town of Lincoln	March 24, 2018	January 1, 2019	Plastic bag ban. Reusable plastic bags must be more than 4 mils. Paper bags must contain at least 40% post-consumer recycled paper content.
Massachusetts	Town of Longmeadow	October 16, 2018	April 16, 2019	Plastic bag ban. Reusable plastic bags must be more than 4 mils. Reusable bags cannot be made of polyethylene or polyvinyl chloride, and must be more than 4 mils. Paper bags must contain at least 40% post-consumer recycled paper content.
Massachusetts	City of Lowell	May 29, 2018	January 1, 2019	Plastic bag ban. Reusable plastic bags must be more than 4 mils. Paper bags must contain at least 40% post-consumer recycled paper content.
Massachusetts	Town of Lunenburg	November 13, 2018	July 1, 2019	Plastic bag ban. Reusable plastic bags must be more than 2.5 mils.
Massachusetts	City of Lynn	April 9, 2019	September 1, 2019	Plastic bag ban.
Massachusetts	Town of Manchester-by-the-Sea	April 2013	January 2014	Plastic bag ban. Reusable plastic bags must be greater than 2.5 mils. Compostable plastic bags allowed.
Massachusetts	Town of Marblehead	May 5, 2014	May 2015	Plastic bag ban. Reusable bags must be at least 3 mils.
Massachusetts	Town of Mashpee	October 17, 2016	January 1, 2017	Plastic bag ban. Reusable bags must be at least 4 mils.
Massachusetts	Town of Medfield	April 28, 2019	November 1, 2019	Plastic bag ban. Paper bags must contain at least 40% post-consumer recycled paper content.
Massachusetts	City of Medford	February 2019	July 16, 2019	Plastic bag ban. Reusable plastic bags must be more than 4 mils. Paper bags must contain at least 40% post-consumer recycled paper content.
Massachusetts	Town of Medway	November 19, 2019	July 1, 2020	Plastic bag ban.
Massachusetts	City of Melrose	December 18, 2017	July 1, 2018	Plastic bag ban. Reusable plastic bags must be at least 4 mils. Paper bags must contain at least 40% post-consumer recycled paper content.
Massachusetts	Town of Milton	October 23, 2018	July 1, 2019	Plastic bag ban. Reusable plastic bags must be more than 4 mils and not made of polyethylene or polyvinyl chloride. Paper bags must contain at least 40% post-consumer recycled paper content.
Massachusetts	Town of Natick	January 10, 2017	August 1, 2017	Plastic bag ban. Reusable bags must be at least 2 mils. Paper bags must have at least 40% post-consumer recycled content.
Massachusetts	City of Newburyport	September 8, 2014	March 29, 2015	Plastic bag ban. Reusable bags must be at least 3 mils.
Massachusetts	City of Newton	January 20, 2015	July 2015	Plastic bag ban. Paper bags must contain at least 40% post-consumer recycled paper content. And as amended on July 8, 2019, reusable bags must be more than 4 mils and not made of polyethylene or polyvinyl chloride, and there is a fee of 10¢ on all shopping bags.
Massachusetts	Town of North Andover	May 15, 2023	January 1, 2024	Plastic bag ban in food businesses with more than 3,000 square feet.
Massachusetts	Town of North Attleborough	June 3, 2019	2020	Plastic bag ban. Reusable plastic bags must be more than 4 mils. Compostable bags allowed.
Massachusetts	City of Northampton	May 2015	January 1, 2016	Plastic shopping bag ban. Reusable bags must be non-plastic. Ban includes produce bags which allows for certified compostable replacements. As amended on January 25, 2021.
Massachusetts	Town of Oak Bluffs	April 12, 2017	January 1, 2018	Plastic bag ban. Reusable bags must be at least 4 mils.
Massachusetts	City of Peabody	October 24, 2019	September 1, 2020	Plastic bag ban. Reusable plastic bags must be more than 5 mils. Paper bags must contain at least 40% post-consumer recycled paper content.
Massachusetts	Town of Pembroke	October 23, 2018	July 1, 2019	Plastic bag ban.
Massachusetts	Town of Pepperell	October 21, 2018	January 1, 2019	Plastic bag ban. Reusable plastic bags must be more than 4 mils. Paper bags must contain at least 40% post-consumer recycled paper content.
Massachusetts	City of Pittsfield	March 26, 2019	January 1, 2020.	Plastic bag ban. Reusable plastic bags must be more than 3 mils.
Massachusetts	Town of Plainville	June 3, 2019	2020	Plastic bag ban. Reusable plastic bags must be more than 4 mils. Paper bags must contain at least 40% post-consumer recycled paper content.
Massachusetts	Town of Plymouth	October 15, 2016	c. August 2017	Plastic bag ban. Reusable bags must be at least 3 mils. Paper bags must contain at least 40% post-consumer recycled paper content.
Massachusetts	Town of Provincetown	October 27, 2014	April 15, 2015	Plastic bag ban. Reusable bags must be at least 1.5 mils.
Massachusetts	City of Quincy	December 2, 2019		Plastic bag ban. Paper bags must contain at least 40% post-consumer recycled paper content.
Massachusetts	Town of Raynham	May 17, 2021	August 15, 2021	Single-use plastic bag ban.
Massachusetts	Town of Reading	November 16, 2017	2018	Plastic bag ban. Reusable bags cannot be made of polyethylene or polyvinyl chloride, and must be at least 3 mils. Paper bags must contain at least 40% post-consumer recycled paper content.
Massachusetts	City of Revere	April 22, 2019	September 1, 2019	Single-use plastic bag ban. Paper bags must contain at least 40% post-consumer recycled paper content. Reusable bags must be more than 4 mils.
Massachusetts	Town of Rockport	September 17, 2017	March 1, 2018	Plastic bag ban. Reusable bags cannot be made of polyethylene or polyvinyl chloride, and must be more than 4 mils. Paper bags must contain at least 40% post-consumer recycled paper content. Compostable plastic bags are permitted.
Massachusetts	Town of Sandwich	November 28, 2016	May 2017	Plastic shopping and produce bag ban. Reusable bags must be at least 4 mils. Paper bags must contain at least 40% post-consumer recycled paper content.
Massachusetts	Town of Saugus	May 6, 2019	January 1, 2020	Plastic shopping bag ban.
Massachusetts	Town of Seekonk	May 13, 2019	January 1, 2020	Plastic shopping bag ban.
Massachusetts	Town of Scituate	November 14, 2018	March 1, 2019	Plastic bag ban. Reusable bags cannot be made of polyethylene or polyvinyl chloride. Paper bags must contain at least 40% post-consumer recycled paper content.
Massachusetts	Town of Sharon	May 1, 2019	2020	Plastic bag ban. Reusable bags must be at least 4 mils and not made of polyethylene or polyvinyl chloride. Paper bags must contain at least 40% post-consumer recycled paper content.
Massachusetts	Town of Shrewsbury	May 17, 2016	July 1, 2017	Plastic bag ban. Reusable bags must be at least 4 mils. Paper bags must contain at least 40% post-consumer recycled paper content.
Massachusetts	City of Somerville	November 24, 2015	November 24, 2016	Plastic bag ban. Reusable bags must pass a 22-pound walk test. Paper bags must contain at least 40% post-consumer recycled paper content.
Massachusetts	Town of South Hadley	May 10, 2017	July 1, 2018	Plastic bag ban. Reusable bags must be at least 4 mils. Compostable bags allowed.
Massachusetts	City of Springfield	April 24, 2019	January 1, 2020	Plastic bag ban except for those that are compostable and marine degradable. Reusable bags must be at least 4 mils and not made of polyethylene, polyethylene terephthalate or polyvinyl chloride. Paper bags must contain at least 40% post-consumer recycled paper content.
Massachusetts	Town of Stockbridge	April 2, 2017	January 2, 2018	Plastic bag ban. Reusable bags must be at least 4 mils. Paper bags must contain at least 40% post-consumer recycled paper content.
Massachusetts	Town of Stoneham	November 4, 2019	May 2020	Plastic bag ban. Reusable bags must be at least 2.25 mils.
Massachusetts	Town of Tewksbury	October 2, 2018	April 1, 2019	Plastic bag ban. Reusable bags must be at least 3 mils. Paper bags must contain at least 40% post-consumer recycled paper content.
Massachusetts	Town of Tisbury	April 12, 2016	January 1, 2017	Plastic bag ban. Reusable bags must be at least 4 mils.
Massachusetts	Town of Truro	November 5, 2015	June 1, 2016	Plastic bag ban. Reusable bags must be at least 1.5 mils.
Massachusetts	City of Waltham	December 27, 2021	June 25, 2022	Plastic bag ban. Reusable bags must be at least 4 mils. Paper bags must contain at least 40% post-consumer, recycled paper content. There is a fee of 10¢ on all shopping bags.
Massachusetts	Town of Watertown	June 7, 2016	July 1, 2017	Plastic bag ban. Reusable bags must be at least 3 mils. Paper bags must contain at least 40% post-consumer, recycled paper content.
Massachusetts	Town of Wayland	April 3, 2017	2018	Plastic bag ban. Reusable bags must be at least 4 mils. Paper bags must contain at least 40% post-consumer recycled paper content.
Massachusetts	Town of Wellesley	April 11, 2016	January 1, 2017	Plastic bag ban. Reusable bags must be at least 4 mils. Paper bags must contain at least 40% post-consumer recycled paper content.
Massachusetts	Town of Wellfleet	April 2015	January 1, 2016	Plastic bag ban. Reusable bags must be at least 3.5 mils.
Massachusetts	Town of West Tisbury	April 12, 2016	January 1, 2017	Plastic bag ban. Reusable bags must be at least 4 mils.
Massachusetts	Town of Westborough	March 17, 2018	September 17, 2018	Plastic bag ban. Reusable bags must be at least 4 mils. Paper bags must contain at least 40% post-consumer recycled paper content.
Massachusetts	Town of Weston	May 10, 2017	January 1, 2018	Plastic bag ban. Reusable bags must be at least 4 mils. Paper bags must contain at least 40% post-consumer recycled paper content.
Massachusetts	Town of Williamstown	May 19, 2015	November 2015	Plastic bag ban including produce bags and dry cleaning bags. Reusable shopping bags must be at least 4 mils.
Massachusetts	Town of Wilmington	May 5, 2018	May 6, 2019	Plastic bag ban. Reusable shopping bags must be more than 2.5 mils.
Massachusetts	Town of Winthrop	April 2, 2020	November 1, 2020	Plastic bag ban.
Massachusetts	City of Worcester	October 15, 2019	July 1, 2020	Plastic bag ban. Reusable bags must be at least 3 mils. Paper bags must contain at least 40% post-consumer recycled paper content. Fee of 5¢ on single-use bags. Compostable plastic bags allowed.
Massachusetts	Town of Wrentham	June 3, 2019	2020	Plastic bag ban. Reusable shopping bags must be at least 4 mils. Paper bags must contain at least 40% post-consumer recycled paper content.
Massachusetts	Town of Yarmouth	May 6, 2017	May 2018	Plastic shopping and produce bag ban. Paper bags must contain at least 40% post-consumer recycled paper content.
Minnesota ^{3}	City of Duluth	November 2019	April 2020	5 cent charge
Minnesota ^{3}	City of Minneapolis	November 26, 2019	January 1, 2020	5 cent charge
Montana	City of Bozeman	November 5, 2024	May 1, 2025	Bans the sale or distribution of polystyrene foam and the use of single-use plastic bags, straws, and stirrers.
New Jersey	Statewide	November 4, 2020	May 4, 2022	Single-use plastic bags, polystyrene foam, and single-use paper bags (in grocery stores larger than 2500 sq ft) banned. Plastic straws upon request only took effect November 4, 2021.
New Jersey	Borough of Avalon	September 12, 2018	June 1, 2019	Single-use plastic bags, straws, and styrofoam banned.
New Jersey	City of Brigantine	September 5, 2018	June 1, 2019	Single-use plastic bags banned.
New Jersey	Borough of Glen Rock	April 10, 2019	January 1, 2020	Single-use plastic bags banned. Minimum of $.10 fee for reusable and recyclable paper bags.
New Jersey	Jersey City	June 27, 2018	June 28, 2019	Single-use plastic and non-recyclable paper bags banned.
New Jersey	Borough of Longport	November 20, 2015	2015	A fee of not less than ten cents for each non-reusable carryout bag. Reusable plastic bags must be at least 2.25 mils.
New Jersey	Borough of Paramus	December 17, 2019	January 1, 2020	Single-use plastic bags banned.
New Jersey	Village of Ridgewood	June 2019	January 1, 2020	Single-use plastic bags banned.
New Jersey	City of Somers Point	July 7, 2018	January 9, 2019	A fee of not less than five cents for each non-reusable carryout bag, excluding plastic bags without handles for bulk foods. Reusable plastic bags must be at least 2.25 mils.
New Jersey	Borough of Stone Harbor	September 12, 2018	June 1, 2019	Single-use plastic bags, straws, and styrofoam banned.
New Jersey	City of Ventnor	February 22, 2018	October 1, 2018	A fee of not less than five cents for each non-reusable carryout paper or plastic bags.
New Mexico	City of Carlsbad	September 24, 2024	February 1, 2025	Two-year trial plastic bag ban.
New Mexico	City of Santa Fe	August 2013	January 2014	Plastic bag ban thinner than 2.25 mm.
New Mexico	County of Santa Fe	March 26, 2024	October 26, 2024	Plastic bag, straw, stirrer, and polystyrene ban.
New Mexico	Town of Taos	March 10, 2020	November 1, 2021	Plastic bag ban mm.
New Mexico	City of Las Cruces	August 16, 2021	January 1, 2022	Single-use plastic bag ban.
New Mexico	City of Albuquerque	April 20, 2019	January 1, 2020	Single-use plastic bag ban. Repealed on March 7, 2022.
New Mexico	City of Deming	November 2019	May 16, 2021	Single-use plastic bag ban.
New Mexico	Town of Silver City	July 8, 2014	January 8, 2015	Single-use plastic bag ban.
New Mexico	County of Bernalillo	June 25, 2019	January 1, 2020	Single-use plastic bag ban.
(New York (state)) New York	Statewide	April 22, 2019	March 1, 2020	Plastic bag ban for large retailers that collect NYS sales tax. Counties can impose 5¢ fee on paper. Restaurants are exempt from the ban.
(New York (state)) New York	East Hampton Village	August 2011	February 2012	Plastic bag ban.
(New York (state)) New York	Village of Hastings on Hudson, Town of Greenburgh	November 2014	February 2015	Plastic bag ban.
(New York (state)) New York	Village of Mamaroneck	July 2012	January 2013	Plastic bag ban.
(New York (state)) New York	Town of New Castle	May 31, 2016	January 1, 2017	Plastic bag ban. Paper bags must be at least 40% recycled and carry a 10¢ charge. Reusable bags must be at least 2.25 mils. Minimum 25¢ charge for reusable bags at grocery stores, convenience stores and pharmacies.
(New York (state)) New York	Village of New Paltz	October 22, 2014	April 1, 2015	Plastic bag ban. Reusable bags must be at least 2.25 mils. Paper bags must contain "a minimum of 40% postconsumer recycled content".
(New York (state)) New York	Village of Patchogue	June 8, 2015	September 6, 2016	Plastic bag ban. Reusable bags must be at least 2.25 mils.
(New York (state)) New York	City of Rye	December 2011	May 2012	Plastic bag ban.
(New York (state)) New York	Village of Southampton	April 2011	November 2011	Plastic bag ban.
(New York (state)) New York	Suffolk County	September 2016	January 2018	5¢ fee for single-use plastic and paper bags. Reusable bags must be at least 2.25 mils.
(New York (state)) New York	Ulster County	September 2018	July 2019	Plastic bag ban. Reusable bags must be at least 4 mils. Paper bags must contain "a minimum of 40% postconsumer recycled content. 5¢ fee for single-use plastic and paper bags.
North Carolina	Outer Banks (Dare, Currituck, and Hyde Counties)	June 2009	October 1, 2010	Plastic bag ban. Reusable bags must be at least 2.25 mils. Paper bags must be at least 40% recycled. Bag ban overridden on April 10, 2017, with passage of House Bill 56.
Northern Mariana Islands	Territory-wide			Plastic bag ban.
Ohio	City of Athens	May 1, 2023	January 1, 2024	Plastic bag ban.
Ohio	Cuyahoga County	May 28, 2019	January 1, 2020	Plastic bag ban.
Ohio	City of Bexley	May 2019	January 1, 2020	Plastic bag ban.
Oregon	Statewide		January 1, 2020	Plastic bag ban; 5 cent charge for paper bags. Thicker "multi-use" plastic bags were still allowed under the 2020 law, but in 2025, Governor Kotek signed a ban on these bags, effective 2027.
Oregon	City of Corvallis	July 2012		Plastic bag ban; 5 cent charge for paper bags.
Oregon	City of Eugene	October 2012	May 1, 2013	Plastic bag ban; 5 cent charge for paper bags. Reusable bags must be at least 4 mils.
Oregon	City of Portland	July 2011	October 2011	Plastic bag ban. Reusable bags must be at least 4 mils.
Pennsylvania	Abington Township	February 13, 2025	August 12, 2025	Plastic bag ban.
Pennsylvania	Borough of Ambler	August 16, 2022	August 16, 2022	Plastic bag and expanded polystyrene ban.
Pennsylvania	Charlestown Township	February 3, 2025	August 3, 2025	Single-use plastic bag ban.
Pennsylvania	Cheltenham Township	December 7, 2022	January 1, 2024	Plastic bag ban. 10-cent fee for paper bags.
Pennsylvania	Borough of Doylestown	December 19, 2022	June 17, 2023	Single-use plastic bag ban.
Pennsylvania	Doylestown Township	May 21, 2024	November 17, 2024	Single-use plastic bag ban. Five-cent fee for paper or reusable bag.
Pennsylvania	Easttown Township	June 20, 2022	January 1, 2023	Plastic bag ban. Paper bags must contain at last 40% recycled content.
Pennsylvania	East Fallowfield Township (Chester County)	October 22, 2024	October 27, 2024	Plastic bag ban.
Pennsylvania	Borough of Edgewood (Allegheny County)	October 2, 2023	December 31, 2023	Single-use plastic bag ban.
Pennsylvania	Haverford Township	April 11, 2022	January 1, 2023	Plastic bag and stirrer ban.
Pennsylvania	Borough of Jenkintown	March 25, 2026	July 23, 2026	Single-use plastic bag ban. Retail establishments may provide a recycled paper bag or a reusable bag for a minimum fee of $0.10.
Pennsylvania	Lancaster Township	August 14, 2023	January 1, 2024	Single-use plastic bag ban.
Pennsylvania	Lower Merion Township	June 21, 2023	January 21, 2024	Plastic bag ban. $0.10 fee for paper bags.
Pennsylvania	Borough of Malvern	March 18, 2025	July 16, 2025	Single-use plastic bag ban.
Pennsylvania	Borough of Media	July 21, 2022	January 1, 2023	Plastic bag ban.
Pennsylvania	Montgomery Township	September 26, 2023	April 22, 2024	Plastic bag, straw, and polystyrene container ban.
Pennsylvania	Borough of Narberth	October 18, 2018	April 18, 2019	Plastic bag ban.
Pennsylvania	Nether Providence Township	November 9, 2023	February 1, 2024	Single-use plastic bag ban
Pennsylvania	Borough of New Britain	November 13, 2024	November 18, 2024	Single-use plastic bag ban.
Pennsylvania	Borough of Newtown	March 12, 2024	September 14, 2024	Single-use plastic bag, expanded polystyrene, and plastic straw ban.
Pennsylvania	Newtown Township (Bucks County)	December 6, 2023	April 9, 2024	Plastic bag, plastic straw, and polystyrene food container ban.
Pennsylvania	City of Pittsburgh	April 11, 2022	October 14, 2023	Plastic bag ban; 10-cent charge for paper bags.
Pennsylvania	City of Philadelphia	December 2019	October 1, 2021	Plastic bags under 2.25 mils thick banned.
Pennsylvania	Borough of Phoenixville	January 9, 2024	January 1, 2025	Plastic bag ban.
Pennsylvania	Plymouth Township (Montgomery County)	September 9, 2024	April 9, 2025	Single-use plastic bag ban.
Pennsylvania	Radnor Township	August 15, 2022	February 15, 2023	Plastic bag ban; 10-cent charge for paper bags.
Pennsylvania	Solebury Township	June 21, 2022	September 19, 2022	Plastic bag, straw, and polystyrene food container ban. 10-cent charge for recyclable paper bags.
Pennsylvania	Springfield Township (Montgomery County)	August 9, 2023	February 1, 2024	Single-use plastic bag ban.
Pennsylvania	Borough of Swarthmore	June 12, 2023	January 8, 2024	SIngle-use plastic bag ban, expanded polystyrene, and #6 polystyrene ban.
Pennsylvania	Tredyffrin Township	September 19, 2022	March 18, 2023	Plastic bag ban.
Pennsylvania	Upper Dublin Township	March 12, 2024	September 8, 2024	Single-use plastic bag ban.
Pennsylvania	Upper Merion Township	July 13, 2023	January 1, 2024	Single-use utensils, foam plastic, bags, and straw ban.
Pennsylvania	Upper Moreland Township	July 10, 2023	January 1, 2024	Single-use plastic bag ban.
Pennsylvania	Upper Providence Township (Delaware County)	July 8, 2025	January 1, 2026	Single-use plastic bag and polystyrene ban.
Pennsylvania	Uwchlan Township	September 12, 2022	September 17, 2022	Ban on plastic bags, $0.15 fee for other bags.
Pennsylvania	Borough of West Chester	July 2019	January 1, 2022	Plastic bag and straw ban.
Pennsylvania	Borough of West Conshohocken	May 14, 2024	January 1, 2025	Single-use plastic bag, plastic cutlery, and expanded polystyrene ban.
Pennsylvania	West Goshen Township	December 21, 2021	April 22, 2022	Plastic bag and straw ban.
Pennsylvania	West Norriton Township	November 8, 2022	April 22, 2023	Plastic bag ban.
Pennsylvania	West Vincent Township	July 15, 2024	October 13, 2024	Single-use plastic bag ban, $0.10 fee for paper bags
Pennsylvania	Whitemarsh Township	July 13, 2023	October 11, 2023	Plastic bag ban.
Pennsylvania	Whitpain Township	October 15, 2024	November 1, 2025	Plastic bag ban.
Puerto Rico	Territory-wide	October 2015	July 2016	Plastic bag ban initially by executive order and now a law.
Rhode Island	Statewide	June 29, 2022	January 1, 2024, or one year after the Department of Environmental Management sets up regulations, whichever comes first	Plastic bag ban.
Rhode Island	Town of Barrington	October 2012	January 2013	Plastic bag ban. Reusable bags must be at least 4 mils (as amended on February 1, 2016).
Rhode Island	Town of Bristol			Plastic bag ban.
Rhode Island	City of Cranston	August 22, 2019	January 1, 2021	Single-use plastic bag ban.
Rhode Island	Town of East Greenwich	October 15, 2019	January 15, 2020	Single-use plastic bag ban.
Rhode Island	City of East Providence	May 7, 2019	November 7, 2019	Single-use plastic bag ban.
Rhode Island	Town of Jamestown	September 18, 2017	November 1, 2017	Plastic bag ban. Reusable bags must be at least 4 mils.
Rhode Island	Town of Middletown	May 1, 2017	November 1, 2017	Single-use plastic bag ban.
Rhode Island	Town of Narragansett	February 8, 2022	January 1, 2023	Single-use plastic bag ban.
Rhode Island	City of Newport		November 1, 2017	Single-use plastic bag ban.
Rhode Island	Town of New Shoreham		January 1, 2018	Single-use plastic bag ban.
Rhode Island	Town of Portsmouth	March 12, 2019	September 1, 2018	Single-use plastic bag ban.
Rhode Island	City of Providence	May 1, 2019	October 22, 2019	Single-use plastic bag ban.
Rhode Island	Town of South Kingstown	June 2018	January 1, 2019	Single-use plastic bag ban.
Rhode Island	Town of Warren	June 12, 2018	December 12, 2018	Single-use plastic bag ban.
Rhode Island	Town of Westerly	April 22, 2019	January 1, 2020	Prohibits the distribution of single-use plastic carryout bags at retail stores, restaurants and farmers markets.
South Carolina	Town of Arcadia Lakes	February 7, 2019	March 1, 2020	Single-use plastic bag ban.
South Carolina	Beaufort County	January 22, 2018	November 1, 2018	Prohibits businesses within unincorporated county limits from providing single use plastic carryout bags to customers.
South Carolina	Town of Bluffton	February 13, 2018	November 1, 2018	Single-use plastic bag ban.
South Carolina	City of Camden	March 26, 2019	January 1, 2020	Single-use plastic bag ban.
South Carolina	City of Charleston	November 27, 2018	January 1, 2020	Single-use plastic bag ban.
South Carolina	County of Charleston	March 2019	January 1, 2020	Single-use plastic bag ban.
South Carolina	Town of Edisto Beach	April 11, 2019	January 1, 2020	Single-use plastic bag ban.
South Carolina	Town of Hilton Head Island	January 10, 2018	November 1, 2018	Single-use plastic bag ban.
South Carolina	City of Isle of Palms	March 2019	January 1, 2020	Single-use plastic bag ban.
South Carolina	Town of James Island	November 2019	January 1, 2020	Single-use plastic bag ban.
South Carolina	Town of Mount Pleasant	April 10, 2018	April 16, 2019.	Single-use plastic bag ban.
South Carolina	City of North Myrtle Beach	November 15, 2021	July 1, 2022	Single-use plastic bag ban.
South Carolina	Town of Port Royal	February 14, 2018	November 1, 2019	Single-use plastic bag ban.
South Carolina	Town of Seabrook Island	July 23, 2019	January 1, 2020	Single-use plastic bag ban.
South Carolina	Town of Surfside Beach	January 23, 2018	June 1, 2018	Single-use plastic bag ban.
(Texas) Texas^{2}	City of Austin	March 2012	March 2013	Plastic bag and paper bag ban. Reusable plastic bags must be at least 4 mils. Overturned by Texas Supreme Court in 2018.
(Texas) Texas^{2}	City of Brownsville	December 15, 2009	January 5, 2011	Single-use bag ban. $1 charge per transaction for any number of single-use plastic or paper bags. Reusable bags must be at least 4 mils if plastic or 65# if paper. Overturned by Texas Supreme Court in 2018.
(Texas) Texas^{2}	City of Dallas	March 2014	January 2015	5¢ fee for single-use plastic and paper bags. (Ban on all single-use bags on city property or city events.) Reusable plastic bags must be at least 4 mils. Overturned by Texas Supreme Court in 2018.
(Texas) Texas^{2}	City of Fort Stockton		September 2011	Plastic bag ban. Overturned by Texas Supreme Court in 2018.
(Texas) Texas^{2}	City of South Padre Island	January 2011	January 2012	Plastic bag ban. Overturned by Texas Supreme Court in 2018.
United States Virgin Islands	Territory-wide	October 7, 2016	January 1, 2017	Plastic bag ban.
Utah	City of Moab	September 10, 2018	January 1, 2019	Plastic bag ban.
Utah	City of Park City	May 15, 2017	June 2017	Plastic bag ban.
Utah	City of Logan	December 3, 2019	January 1, 2022 (repealed before taking effect)	Plastic bag ban. Repealed on December 7, 2021, before taking effect.
Vermont	Statewide	June 17, 2019	July 1, 2020	Plastic bag ban. Paper bags have a 10¢ fee.
Vermont	Town of Brattleboro	November 21, 2017	July 1, 2018	Plastic bag ban. Plastic reusable bags must be at least 2.25 mils thick. Certified compostable bags allowed.
Virginia	Albemarle County	May 4, 2022	January 1, 2023	Five-cent tax on lightweight plastic bags.
Virginia	City of Alexandria	September 18, 2021	January 1, 2022	Five-cent tax on lightweight plastic bags.
Virginia	Arlington County	September 18, 2021	January 1, 2022	Five-cent tax on lightweight plastic bags.
Virginia	City of Charlottesville	August 1, 2022	January 1, 2023	Five-cent tax on lightweight plastic bags.
Virginia	City of Fairfax	July 12, 2022	January 1, 2023	Five-cent tax on lightweight plastic bags.
Virginia	Fairfax County	September 14, 2021	January 1, 2022	Five-cent tax on lightweight plastic bags.
Virginia	City of Falls Church	December 13, 2021	April 1, 2022	Five-cent tax on lightweight plastic bags.
Virginia	City of Fredericksburg	September 28, 2021	January 1, 2022	Five-cent tax on lightweight plastic bags.
Virginia	Loudoun County	January 18, 2022	July 1, 2022	Five-cent tax on lightweight plastic bags.
Virginia	City of Richmond	June 2, 2025	January 1, 2026	Five-cent tax on lightweight plastic bags.
Virginia	City of Roanoke	May 17, 2021	January 1, 2022	Five-cent tax on lightweight plastic bags.
(Washington (state)) Washington	Statewide	March 25, 2020	October 1, 2021	Plastic bag ban. 8 cent charge for paper bags. Implementation delayed from January to July 2021 by COVID-19 pandemic.
(Washington (state)) Washington	City of Bainbridge Island	April 2012	November 2012	Plastic bag ban. 5 cent charge for paper bags.
(Washington (state)) Washington	City of Bellingham	July 2011	July 2012	Plastic bag ban. 5 cent minimum charge for paper bags.
(Washington (state)) Washington	City of Edmonds		July 2009	Plastic bag ban.
(Washington (state)) Washington	City of Ellensburg	November 7, 2016	January 1, 2018	Plastic and paper bag fee. Reusable bags must be at least 2.25 mils. 5 cent charge for all carry-out bags.
(Washington (state)) Washington	City of Issaquah	June 2012	March 2013	Plastic bag ban.
(Washington (state)) Washington	City of Mukilteo	December 2011	January 2013	Plastic bag ban.
(Washington (state)) Washington	City of North Bend	December 2018	January 1, 2019	Plastic bag ban.
(Washington (state)) Washington	City of Olympia	October 2013	July 2014	Plastic bag ban. 5 cent charge for paper bags.
(Washington (state)) Washington	City of Port Angeles	April 3, 2018	July 3, 2018	Plastic bag ban. Reusable bags must be at least 2.25 mils. 5 cent charge for all carry-out bags.
(Washington (state)) Washington	City of Port Townsend	July 2012	November 2012	Plastic bag ban. 5 cent charge for paper bags.
(Washington (state)) Washington	City of Seattle	December 2011	July 2012	Plastic bag ban. Reusable bags must be at least 2.25 mils. Minimum 5 cent charge for paper bags.
(Washington (state)) Washington	City of Shoreline	April 2013	February 2014	Plastic bag ban. 5 cent charge for paper bags.
(Washington (state)) Washington	Thurston County (unincorporated areas)	September 2013	July 2014	Plastic bag ban. 5 cent charge for paper bags.
(Washington (state)) Washington	City of Tacoma	July 2016	July 12, 2017	Plastic bag ban. 5 cent minimum charge for each recycled paper or reusable checkout bag requested by customers.
(Washington (state)) Washington	City of Tumwater	September 2013	July 2014	Plastic bag ban. 5 cent charge for paper bags.
Wyoming	City of Jackson	January 8, 2019	April 15, 2019	Plastic bag ban. 20 cent charge for paper bags or reusable plastic bags (greater than 4 mils thick).

Notes

- ^{1} Although the state of Hawaii does not ban plastic bags, all of its local jurisdictions do, effectively banning them statewide.
- ^{2} On June 22, 2018, the Texas Supreme Court ruled that a bag ban implemented by Laredo, TX was in violation of state law. In response, Texas Attorney General Ken Paxton sent letters to 11 other Texas cities with bag bans telling them that such bans were now illegal and unenforceable. On July 3, 2018, the City of Austin announced that it would end enforcement of its bag ban.
- ^{3}Minnesota has a preemption on local laws that ban plastic bags, but allows for fees on them instead.

== California ==
Californians voted in November 2016 to approve state legislation banning plastic bags statewide in Propositions 67 and 65. Over 100 local laws with similar or tougher regulations will remain and supersede the statewide legislation.

Local laws governing plastic bag use in California
Region	County	Jurisdictions covered	Passage date	Effective date	Effect
Central Valley	Sacramento County	Sacramento	2015 – March	2016 – January	Plastic bag ban; 10 cent charge for paper bags.
Central Valley	Sacramento County	Unincorporated territories	2016 – April	2016 – July	Plastic bag ban; 10 cent charge for paper bags.
Central Valley	Yolo County	Davis	2013 – November	2014 – July	Plastic bag ban.
Greater Los Angeles Area	Los Angeles County	Beverly Hills	2014 – April 22	2014 – July 1	Plastic bag ban; 10 cent charge for paper bags.
Greater Los Angeles Area	Los Angeles County	Calabasas	2011 – February	2011 – July	Plastic bag ban; 10 cent charge for paper bags.
Greater Los Angeles Area	Los Angeles County	Culver City	2013 – May	2013 – December	Plastic bag ban; 10 cent charge for paper bags.
Greater Los Angeles Area	Los Angeles County	Glendale	2013 – January	2013 – July	Plastic bag ban; 10 cent charge for paper bags.
Greater Los Angeles Area	Los Angeles County	Hermosa Beach	–	2016 – April	Plastic bag ban; 10 cent charge for paper bags.
Greater Los Angeles Area	Los Angeles County	Long Beach	2012 – February	2013 – January	Plastic bag ban; 10 cent charge for paper bags.
Greater Los Angeles Area	Los Angeles County	Los Angeles	2013 – June	2014 – January	Plastic bag ban; 10 cent charge for paper bags.
Greater Los Angeles Area	Los Angeles County	Malibu	2008 – May	2009 – May	Plastic bag ban.
Greater Los Angeles Area	Los Angeles County	Manhattan Beach	2008 – July	2011 – July	Plastic bag ban.
Greater Los Angeles Area	Los Angeles County	Monrovia	2014 – July	2015 – January	Plastic bag ban; 10 cent charge for paper bags.
Greater Los Angeles Area	Los Angeles County	Pasadena	2011 – November	2012 – July	Plastic bag ban; 10 cent charge for paper bags.
Greater Los Angeles Area	Los Angeles County	Pico Rivera	2014 – October	2016 – July	Plastic bag ban; 10 cent charge for paper bags.
Greater Los Angeles Area	Los Angeles County	Santa Monica	2011 – February	2011 – September	Plastic bag ban; 10 cent charge for paper bags.
Greater Los Angeles Area	Los Angeles County	South Pasadena	2014 – October	2014 – December	Plastic bag ban; 10 cent charge for paper bags.
Greater Los Angeles Area	Los Angeles County	West Hollywood	2012 – August	2013 – February	Plastic bag ban; 10 cent charge for paper bags.
Greater Los Angeles Area	Los Angeles County	Unincorporated territories	2010 – November	2012 – January	Plastic bag ban; 10 cent charge for paper bags.
Greater Los Angeles Area	Orange County	Dana Point	2012 – March	2013 – April	Plastic bag ban.
Greater Los Angeles Area	Orange County	Huntington Beach	2013 – April	2013 – November	Plastic bag ban; 10 cent charge for paper bags.
Greater Los Angeles Area	Orange County	Laguna Beach	2012 – February	2013 – January	Plastic bag ban; 10 cent charge for paper bags.
Greater Los Angeles Area	Riverside County	Cathedral City	2015 – July	2016 – February	Plastic bag ban; 10 cent charge for paper bags.
Greater Los Angeles Area	Riverside County	Desert Hot Springs	2014 – March	2014 – September	Plastic bag ban. Small fee for paper bag.
Greater Los Angeles Area	Riverside County	Indio	2014 – May	2014 – November	Plastic bag ban; 10 cent charge for paper bags.
Greater Los Angeles Area	Riverside County	Palm Desert	2014 – May	2015 – October	Plastic bag ban; 10 cent charge for paper bags.
Greater Los Angeles Area	Riverside County	Palm Springs	2014 – April	2014 – November	Plastic bag ban; 10 cent charge for paper bags.
Greater Los Angeles Area	Ventura County	Ojai	2012 – April	2012 – July	Plastic bag ban; 10 cent charge for paper bags.
Northern California	Butte County	Chico	2014 – May	2015 – January	Plastic bag ban; 10 cent charge for paper bags.
Northern California	El Dorado County	South Lake Tahoe	2013 – October	2014 – February	Plastic bag ban; 10 cent charge for paper bags.
Northern California	Humboldt County	Arcata	–	2014 – February	Plastic bag ban; 10 cent charge for paper bags.
Northern California	Mendocino County	Fort Bragg	2012 – May	2013 – December	Plastic bag ban; 10 cent charge for paper bags.
Northern California	Mendocino County	Ukiah	2012 – May	2013 – February	Plastic bag ban; 10 cent charge for paper bags.
Northern California	Mendocino County	Unincorporated territories	2012 – June	2013 – January	Plastic bag ban; 10 cent charge for paper bags.
Northern California	Mono County	Mammoth Lakes	–	2016 – March	Plastic bag ban.
Northern California	Monterey County	Carmel-by-the-Sea	2012 – July	2013 – February	Plastic bag ban; 10 cent charge for paper bags.
Northern California	Monterey County	Greenfield	2014 – August	2015 – February	Plastic bag ban; 10 cent charge for paper bags.
Northern California	Monterey County	Gonzales	2014 – July	2015 – January	Plastic bag ban; 10 cent charge for paper bags.
Northern California	Monterey County	Pacific Grove	2014 – August	2015 – March	Plastic bag ban; 10 cent charge for paper bags.
Northern California	Monterey County	King City	2014 – September	2015 – January	Plastic bag ban; 10 cent charge for paper bags.
Northern California	Monterey County	Marina	–	2014 – August	Plastic bag ban; 10 cent charge for paper bags.
Northern California	Monterey County	Monterey	2011 – December	2012 – June	Plastic bag ban; 25 cent charge for paper bags.
Northern California	Monterey County	Salinas	–	2014 – August	Plastic bag ban; 10 cent charge for paper bags.
Northern California	Monterey County	Seaside	2014 – August	2015 – September	Plastic bag ban; 10 cent charge for paper bags.
Northern California	Monterey County	Soledad	2014 – October	2015 – May	Plastic bag ban; 10 cent charge for paper bags.
Northern California	Monterey County	Unincorporated territories	–	2014 – August	Plastic bag ban; 10 cent charge for paper bags.
Northern California	Nevada County	Grass Valley	2014 – August	2015 – January	Plastic bag ban. Small fee for paper bag.
Northern California	Nevada County	Nevada City	2014 – June	2015 – July	Plastic bag ban; 10 cent charge for paper bags.
Northern California	Nevada County	Truckee	2013 – November	2014 – June	Plastic bag ban; 10 cent charge for paper bags.
Greater San Francisco Bay Area	Alameda County	Alameda	2012 – January	2013 – January	Plastic bag ban for food and liquor stores, and pharmacies; reusable bags must be at least 2.25 mils; 10 cent charge for paper bags.
Greater San Francisco Bay Area	Alameda County	Albany	2012 – January	2013 – January	Plastic bag ban for food and liquor stores, and pharmacies; reusable bags must be at least 2.25 mils; 10 cent charge for paper bags.
Greater San Francisco Bay Area	Alameda County	Berkeley	2012 – January	2013 – January	Plastic bag ban for food and liquor stores, and pharmacies; reusable bags must be at least 2.25 mils; 10 cent charge for paper bags.
Greater San Francisco Bay Area	Alameda County	Dublin	2012 – January	2013 – January	Plastic bag ban for food and liquor stores, and pharmacies; reusable bags must be at least 2.25 mils; 10 cent charge for paper bags.
Greater San Francisco Bay Area	Alameda County	Emeryville	2012 – January	2013 – January	Plastic bag ban for food and liquor stores, and pharmacies; reusable bags must be at least 2.25 mils; 10 cent charge for paper bags.
Greater San Francisco Bay Area	Alameda County	Fremont	2012 – January	2013 – January	Plastic bag ban for food and liquor stores, and pharmacies; reusable bags must be at least 2.25 mils; 10 cent charge for paper bags.
Greater San Francisco Bay Area	Alameda County	Hayward	2012 – January	2013 – January	Plastic bag ban for food and liquor stores, and pharmacies; reusable bags must be at least 2.25 mils; 10 cent charge for paper bags.
Greater San Francisco Bay Area	Alameda County	Livermore	2012 – January	2013 – January	Plastic bag ban for food and liquor stores, and pharmacies; reusable bags must be at least 2.25 mils; 10 cent charge for paper bags.
Greater San Francisco Bay Area	Alameda County	Oakland	2012 – January	2013 – January	Plastic bag ban for food and liquor stores, and pharmacies; reusable bags must be at least 2.25 mils; 10 cent charge for paper bags.
Greater San Francisco Bay Area	Alameda County	Piedmont	2012 – January	2013 – January	Plastic bag ban for food and liquor stores, and pharmacies; reusable bags must be at least 2.25 mils; 10 cent charge for paper bags.
Greater San Francisco Bay Area	Alameda County	Pleasanton	2012 – January	2013 – January	Plastic bag ban for food and liquor stores, and pharmacies; reusable bags must be at least 2.25 mils; 10 cent charge for paper bags.
Greater San Francisco Bay Area	Alameda County	San Leandro	2012 – January	2013 – January	Plastic bag ban for food and liquor stores, and pharmacies; reusable bags must be at least 2.25 mils; 10 cent charge for paper bags.
Greater San Francisco Bay Area	Alameda County	Union City	2012 – January	2013 – January	Plastic bag ban for food and liquor stores, and pharmacies; reusable bags must be at least 2.25 mils; 10 cent charge for paper bags.
Greater San Francisco Bay Area	Alameda County	Unincorporated territories	2012 – January	2013 – January	Plastic bag ban for food and liquor stores, and pharmacies; reusable bags must be at least 2.25 mils; 10 cent charge for paper bags.
Greater San Francisco Bay Area	Contra Costa County				
Greater San Francisco Bay Area	Contra Costa County	Danville	2014 – December	2016 – July	Plastic bag ban.
Greater San Francisco Bay Area	Contra Costa County	Hercules	2014 – September	2015 – January	Plastic bag ban; 10 cent charge for paper bags.
Greater San Francisco Bay Area	Contra Costa County	Lafayette	2014 – December	2015 – July	Plastic bag ban; 10 cent charge for paper bags.
Greater San Francisco Bay Area	Contra Costa County	Martinez	–	2014	Plastic bag ban.
Greater San Francisco Bay Area	Contra Costa County	Pittsburg	2013 – October	2014 – January	Plastic bag ban; phased charge for paper bags until 25 cents in the third year.
Greater San Francisco Bay Area	Contra Costa County	Pleasant Hill	–	2014 – August	Plastic bag ban; 10 cent charge for paper bags.
Greater San Francisco Bay Area	Contra Costa County	Richmond	2013 – July	2014 – January	Plastic bag ban; 10 cent charge for paper bags.
Greater San Francisco Bay Area	Contra Costa County	San Pablo	2013 – October	2014 – January	Plastic bag ban. Ten cent fee for paper bag.
Greater San Francisco Bay Area	Contra Costa County	Walnut Creek	2014 – March	2014 – September	Plastic bag ban; 10 cent charge for paper bags.
Greater San Francisco Bay Area	Marin County				
Greater San Francisco Bay Area	Marin County	Corte Madera	2015 – July	2015 – September	Plastic bag ban. 10 cent charge for paper bag.
Greater San Francisco Bay Area	Marin County	Fairfax	2007 – August	2008 – November	Plastic bag ban. 10 cent charge for paper bag.
Greater San Francisco Bay Area	Marin County	Larkspur	2014 – May	2014 – November	Plastic bag ban. 10 cent charge for paper bag.
Greater San Francisco Bay Area	Marin County	Mill Valley	2013 – October 21	2013 – November 21	Plastic bag ban; 5 cent charge for paper bags.
Greater San Francisco Bay Area	Marin County	Novato	–	2014 – March	Plastic bag ban. 10 cent charge for paper bag.
Greater San Francisco Bay Area	Marin County	Ross	2014 – September	2015 – April	Plastic bag ban. 10 cent charge for paper bag.
Greater San Francisco Bay Area	Marin County	San Anselmo	–	2015 – January	Plastic bag ban. 10 cent charge for paper bag.
Greater San Francisco Bay Area	Marin County	San Rafael	2014 – March	2014 – September	Plastic bag ban. 10 cent charge for paper bag.
Greater San Francisco Bay Area	Marin County	Sausalito	–	2014 – March	Plastic bag ban. 10 cent charge for paper bag.
Greater San Francisco Bay Area	Marin County	Tiburon	–	2014 – September	Plastic bag ban. 10 cent charge for paper bag.
Greater San Francisco Bay Area	Marin County	Unincorporated territories	2011 – January	2012 – January	Plastic bag ban.
Greater San Francisco Bay Area	Napa County				
Greater San Francisco Bay Area	Napa County	American Canyon	–	2016 – January	Plastic bag ban; 10 cent charge for paper bags.
Greater San Francisco Bay Area	Napa County	Calistoga	2014 – August	2015 – January	Plastic bag ban; 10 cent charge for paper bags.
Greater San Francisco Bay Area	Napa County	Napa	Napa	2014 – August	Plastic bag ban; 10 cent charge for paper bags.
Greater San Francisco Bay Area	Napa County	St. Helena	2014 – August	2015 – January	Plastic bag ban. Ten cent fee for paper bag.
Greater San Francisco Bay Area	Napa County	Yountville	2016 – February	2016 – March	Plastic bag ban. Ten cent fee for paper bag.
Greater San Francisco Bay Area	Napa County	Unincorporated territories	2016 – January	2016 – July	Plastic bag ban. Ten cent fee for paper bag.
Greater San Francisco Bay Area	San Francisco City and County	San Francisco	2007 – April		Limited plastic bag ban.
Greater San Francisco Bay Area	San Francisco City and County	San Francisco	2012 – February	2012 – October	Expansion of ban to cover all retail stores in 2012 and all restaurants in 2013. 10 cent charge for paper bags.
Greater San Francisco Bay Area	San Mateo County	Belmont	2013 – January	2013 – April	Plastic bag ban; 10 cent charge for paper bags.
Greater San Francisco Bay Area	San Mateo County	Brisbane	2013 – March	2013 – April	Plastic bag ban; 10 cent charge for paper bags.
Greater San Francisco Bay Area	San Mateo County	Burlingame	2013 – March	2013 – April	Plastic bag ban; 10 cent charge for paper bags.
Greater San Francisco Bay Area	San Mateo County	Colma	2013 – January	2013 – April	Plastic bag ban; 10 cent charge for paper bags.
Greater San Francisco Bay Area	San Mateo County	Daly City	2013 – January	2013 – April	Plastic bag ban; 10 cent charge for paper bags.
Greater San Francisco Bay Area	San Mateo County	East Palo Alto	2013 – April	2013 – October	Plastic bag ban; 10 cent charge for paper bags.
Greater San Francisco Bay Area	San Mateo County	Half Moon Bay	2013 – March	2013 – April	Plastic bag ban; 10 cent charge for paper bags.
Greater San Francisco Bay Area	San Mateo County	Menlo Park	2013 – March	2013 – April	Plastic bag ban; 10 cent charge for paper bags.
Greater San Francisco Bay Area	San Mateo County	Millbrae	2012 – February	2012 – September	Plastic bag ban; 10 cent charge for paper bags.
Greater San Francisco Bay Area	San Mateo County	Pacifica	2012 – December	2013 – April	Plastic bag ban; 10 cent charge for paper bags.
Greater San Francisco Bay Area	San Mateo County	Portola Valley	2013 – January	2013 – April	Plastic bag ban; 10 cent charge for paper bags.
Greater San Francisco Bay Area	San Mateo County	Redwood City	2013 – March	2013 – October	Plastic bag ban; 10 cent charge for paper bags.
Greater San Francisco Bay Area	San Mateo County	San Bruno	2013 – January	2013 – April	Plastic bag ban; 10 cent charge for paper bags.
Greater San Francisco Bay Area	San Mateo County	San Carlos	2013 – March	2013 – July	Plastic bag ban; 10 cent charge for paper bags.
Greater San Francisco Bay Area	San Mateo County	San Mateo	2013 – May	2013 – June	Plastic bag ban; 10 cent charge for paper bags.
Greater San Francisco Bay Area	San Mateo County	South San Francisco	2012 – December	2013 – April	Plastic bag ban; 10 cent charge for paper bags.
Greater San Francisco Bay Area	San Mateo County	Unincorporated territories	2012 – November	2013 – April	Plastic bag ban; 10 cent charge for paper bags.
Greater San Francisco Bay Area	Santa Clara County	Campbell^{1}	2013 – July	2014 – January	Plastic bag ban; 10 cent charge for paper bags.
Greater San Francisco Bay Area	Santa Clara County	Cupertino	2013 – March	2013 – October	Plastic bag ban; 10 cent charge for paper bags.
Greater San Francisco Bay Area	Santa Clara County	Los Altos^{1}	2013 – March	2013 – July	Plastic bag ban; 10 cent charge for paper bags.
Greater San Francisco Bay Area	Santa Clara County	Los Gatos^{1}	2013 – September	2014 – February	Plastic bag ban; 10 cent charge for paper bags.
Greater San Francisco Bay Area	Santa Clara County	Milpitas	2015 – September	2016 – July	Plastic bag ban; 10 cent charge for paper bags.
Greater San Francisco Bay Area	Santa Clara County	Morgan Hill	2013 – October	2014 – April	Plastic bag ban; 10 cent charge for paper bags.
Greater San Francisco Bay Area	Santa Clara County	Mountain View^{1}	2012 – December	2013 – April	Plastic bag ban; 10 cent charge for paper bags.
Greater San Francisco Bay Area	Santa Clara County	Palo Alto			Plastic bag ban; 10 cent charge for paper bags.
Greater San Francisco Bay Area	Santa Clara County	Palo Alto	2013 – May	2013 – July	Plastic bag ban; 10 cent charge for paper bags.
Greater San Francisco Bay Area	Santa Clara County	San Jose	2011 – January	2012 – January	Plastic bag ban; 10 cent charge for paper bags.
Greater San Francisco Bay Area	Santa Clara County	Santa Clara	2014 – September	2014 – December	Plastic bag ban; 10 cent charge for paper bags.
Greater San Francisco Bay Area	Santa Clara County	Sunnyvale	2011 – December	2012 – June	Plastic bag ban; 10 cent charge for paper bags.
Greater San Francisco Bay Area	Santa Clara County	Unincorporated territories	2011 – April	2012 – January	Plastic bag ban; 10 cent charge for paper bags.
Greater San Francisco Bay Area	Santa Cruz County	Capitola	2013 – January	2013 – April	Plastic bag ban; 25 cent charge for paper bags.
Greater San Francisco Bay Area	Santa Cruz County	Santa Cruz	2012 – July	2013 – April	Plastic bag ban; 10 cent charge for paper bags.
Greater San Francisco Bay Area	Santa Cruz County	Watsonville	2012 – May	2012 – June	Plastic bag ban; 25 cent charge for paper bags.
Greater San Francisco Bay Area	Santa Cruz County	Unincorporated territories	2011 – September	2012 – March	Plastic bag ban; 10 cent charge for paper bags.
Greater San Francisco Bay Area	Santa Cruz County	Unincorporated territories	2012 – October	2013 – April	Expansion of ban to restaurants.
Greater San Francisco Bay Area	Sonoma County	Cloverdale	2014 – February	2014 – September	Plastic bag ban; 10 cent charge for paper bags.
Greater San Francisco Bay Area	Sonoma County	Cotati	2014 – February	2014 – September	Plastic bag ban; 10 cent charge for paper bags.
Greater San Francisco Bay Area	Sonoma County	Healdsburg	2014 – February	2014 – September	Plastic bag ban; 10 cent charge for paper bags.
Greater San Francisco Bay Area	Sonoma County	Petaluma	2014 – February	2014 – September	Plastic bag ban; 10 cent charge for paper bags.
Greater San Francisco Bay Area	Sonoma County	Rohnert Park	2014 – February	2014 – September	Plastic bag ban; 10 cent charge for paper bags.
Greater San Francisco Bay Area	Sonoma County	Santa Rosa	2014 – February	2014 – September	Plastic bag ban; 10 cent charge for paper bags.
Greater San Francisco Bay Area	Sonoma County	Sebastopol	2014 – February	2014 – September	Plastic bag ban; 10 cent charge for paper bags.
Greater San Francisco Bay Area	Sonoma County	Sonoma	2014 – February	2014 – September	Plastic bag ban; 10 cent charge for paper bags.
Greater San Francisco Bay Area	Sonoma County	Windsor	2014 – February	2014 – September	Plastic bag ban; 10 cent charge for paper bags.
Greater San Francisco Bay Area	Sonoma County	Unincorporated territories	2014 – February	2014 – September	Plastic bag ban; 10 cent charge for paper bags.
Southern California	San Diego County	Del Mar	2016 – May	2016 – November (retail); 2017 – May (restaurants)	Plastic bag ban.
Southern California	San Diego County	Encinitas	2014 – September	2015 – April	Plastic bag ban. Small fee for paper bag.
Southern California	San Diego County	San Diego	2016 – July	2017 – January	Plastic bag ban. Ten cent fee for paper bag.
Southern California	San Diego County	Solana Beach	2012 – May	2012 – June	Plastic bag ban; 10 cent charge for paper bags.
Southern California	San Luis Obispo County	Arroyo Grande	2012 – January	2012 – October	Plastic bag ban; 10 cent charge for paper bags.
Southern California	San Luis Obispo County	Atascadero	2012 – January	2012 – October	Plastic bag ban; 10 cent charge for paper bags.
Southern California	San Luis Obispo County	Grover Beach	2012 – January	2012 – October	Plastic bag ban; 10 cent charge for paper bags.
Southern California	San Luis Obispo County	Morro Bay	2012 – January	2012 – October	Plastic bag ban; 10 cent charge for paper bags.
Southern California	San Luis Obispo County	Paso Robles	2012 – January	2012 – October	Plastic bag ban; 10 cent charge for paper bags.
Southern California	San Luis Obispo County	Pismo Beach	2012 – January	2012 – October	Plastic bag ban; 10 cent charge for paper bags.
Southern California	San Luis Obispo County	San Luis Obispo	2012 – January	2012 – October	Plastic bag ban; 10 cent charge for paper bags.
Southern California	San Luis Obispo County	Unincorporated territories	2012 – January	2012 – October	Plastic bag ban; 10 cent charge for paper bags.
Southern California	Santa Barbara County	Carpinteria	2012 – March	2012 – July	Plastic bag ban; 10 cent charge for paper bags.
Southern California	Santa Barbara County	Santa Barbara	2013 – October	2014 – December	Plastic bag ban. Ten cent fee for paper bag.

Notes:

- ^{1} The San Mateo County Environmental Impact Report also studied six cities in neighboring Santa Clara County. Campbell, Los Altos, Los Gatos, and Mountain View opted to join San Mateo County's ordinance because of this.
- *A loophole in the bag ban allowed for "reusable" plastic bags to be sold at checkout. The bags looked and acted just like the previous single-use plastic bags but were just thicker, and customers still used them as though they were single use. (Hines, Fiona (August 16, 2024), The Problem with "Reusable" Plastic Bags)
