= American Recyclable Plastic Bag Alliance =

Manufacturers and recyclers' lobby group

The American Recyclable Plastic Bag Alliance (ARPBA), formerly the American Progressive Bag Alliance (APBA), is a lobbying group that represents the U.S. plastic bag manufacturing and recycling industry. Founded in 2005, it lobbies against U.S. local and state plastic bag bans and taxes.

The ARPBA is connected to the Society of the Plastics Industry, an industry trade group, while the APBA was connected to the American Chemistry Council.

In January 2020, the organization was renamed the American Recyclable Plastic Bag Alliance, promoting a pact by its members to use at least 20% recycled plastics in its products.

== Activities ==
The ARPBA has actively lobbied against bag fees and bans in numerous states, including Massachusetts, New Jersey, and Virginia. Prior to the passage of California legislation banning plastic shopping bags, the ARPBA gathered a petition with over 800,000 signatures, spending over $3 million in an unsuccessful attempt to block the ban.
