= Bag =

Flexible container

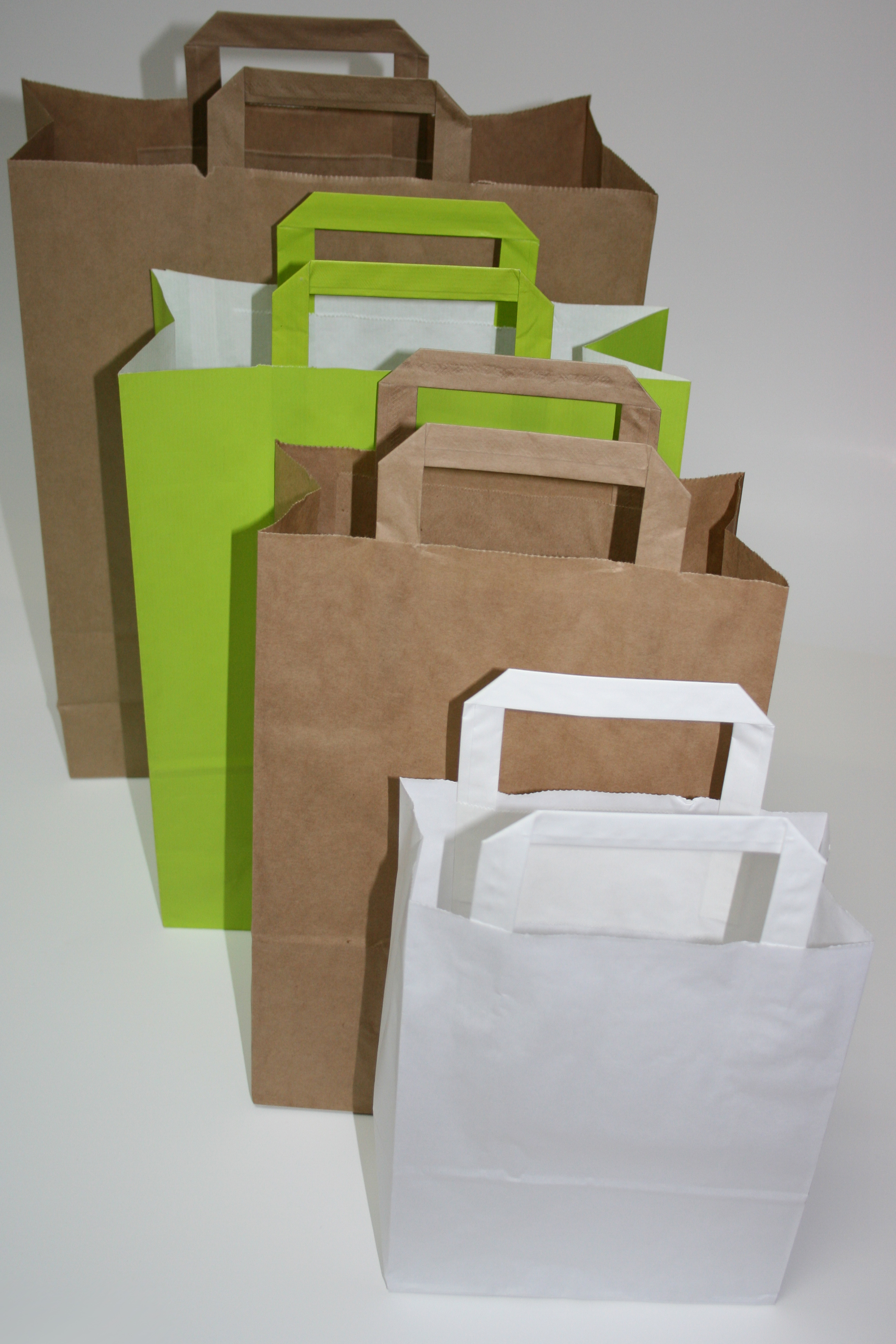
Paper bags with handles

A bag, also known regionally as a sack or tote, is a common tool in the form of a floppy container, typically made of cloth, leather, bamboo, paper, or plastic. The use of bags predates recorded history, with the earliest bags being lengths of animal skin, cotton, or woven plant fibers, folded up at the edges and secured in that shape with strings of the same material. Bags can be used to carry items such as personal belongings, groceries, tools, and other objects. They come in various shapes and sizes, often equipped with handles or straps for easier carrying.

Bags have been fundamental for the development of human civilization, as they allow people to easily collect and carry loose materials, such as berries or food grains, while also allowing them to carry more items in their hands.

The English word probably originates from the Norse word baggi, from the reconstructed Proto-Indo-European bʰak, but is also comparable to the Welsh baich (load, bundle), and the Greek Τσιαντουλίτσα (Chandulícha, load).

Cheap disposable paper bags and plastic shopping bags are very common, varying in size and strength in the retail trade as a convenience for shoppers, and are often supplied by the shop for free or for a small fee. Customers may also take their own shopping bag(s) to use in shops.

== History ==
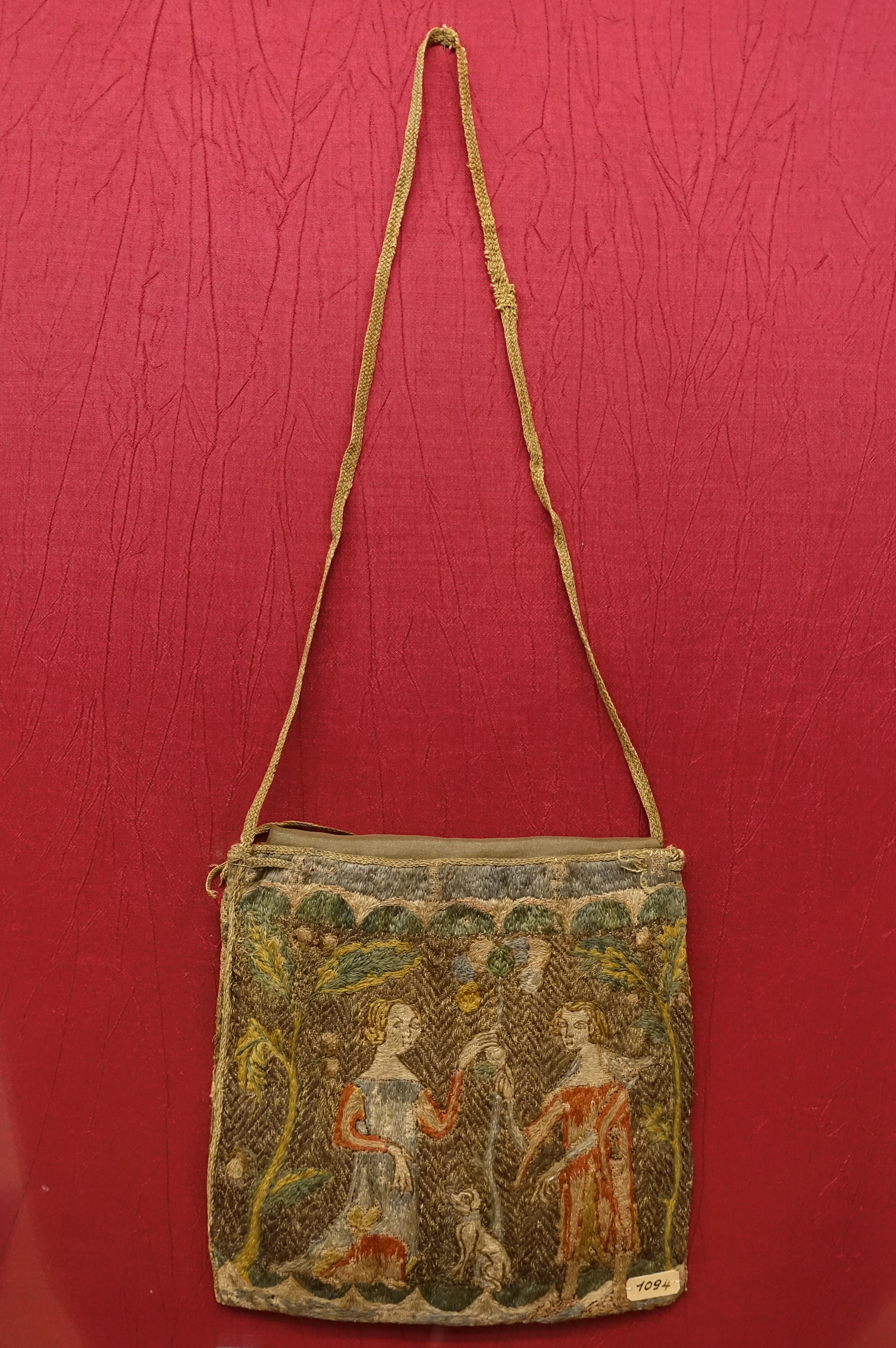
Embroidered purse, France, mid 14th century AD

Bags have been attested for thousands of years, and bags have also been used by men, women, and children of all ages. Bags have been prevalent as far back as Ancient Egypt. Many hieroglyphs depict males with bags tied around their waists. Bags encasing cosmetic sticks from the Bronze Age, around 2000 BCE, have been excavated in the Xiaohe Cemetery in China. The Bible mentions pouches, especially with regard to Judas Iscariot carrying one around, holding his personal items, in the first century. In the 14th century, wary of pickpockets and thieves, many people used drawstring bags to carry their money. These bags were attached to girdles via a long cord fastened to the waist.

The Australian dillybag is a traditional Australian Aboriginal bag generally woven from plant fibres. Dillybags were and are mainly designed and used by women to gather and transport food, and are most commonly found in the northern parts of Australia.

Although paper had been used for wrapping and padding in Ancient China since the 2nd century BC, the first use of paper bags in China (for preserving the flavor of tea) came during the later Tang dynasty (618–907 AD).

In medieval Europe, women also wore more ornate drawstring bags, typically called hamondeys or tasques, to display their social status. The 14th-century handbags evolved into wedding gifts from groom to bride. These medieval pouches were embroidered, often with depictions of love stories or songs. Eventually, these pouches evolved into what were known as a chaneries, which were used for gaming or food for falcons. During the Renaissance, Elizabethan England's fashions were more ornate than ever before. Women wore their pouches underneath the vast array of petticoats and men wore leather pockets or bagges inside their breeches. Aristocrats began carrying swete bagges filled with sweet-smelling material to make up for poor hygiene.

Indigenous tribes in what would become the United States and Canada made the parfleche, a bag or container made of buffalo rawhide and decorated with pigments. The use of this bag was to hold objects, whether that was when they were migrating to another place or they were established in a certain area. The parfleche is made by Indigenous women as an art of expression and symbolism. The symbols engage with Indigenous perspectives from different tribes.

== Modern ==
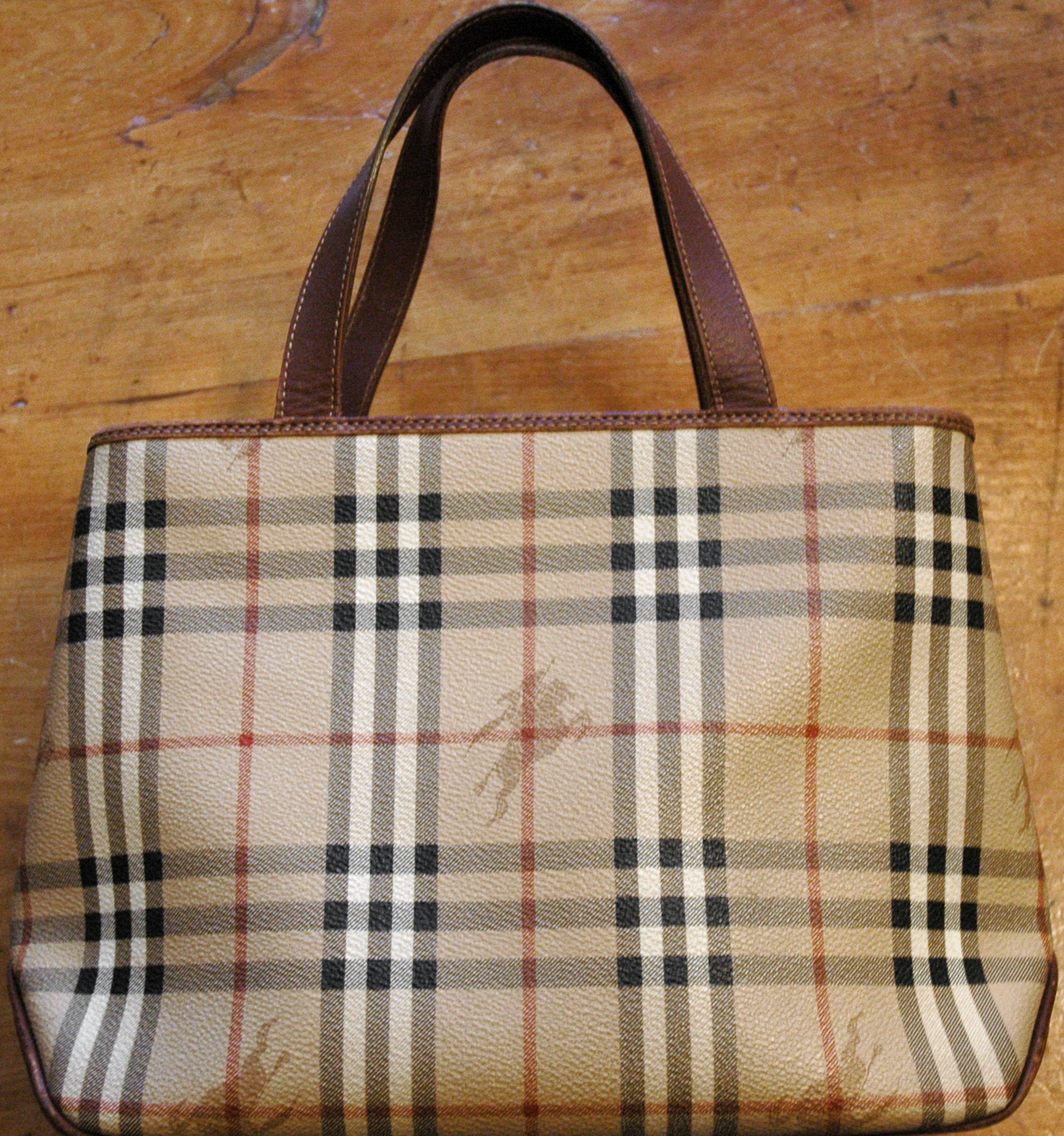
A tote bag

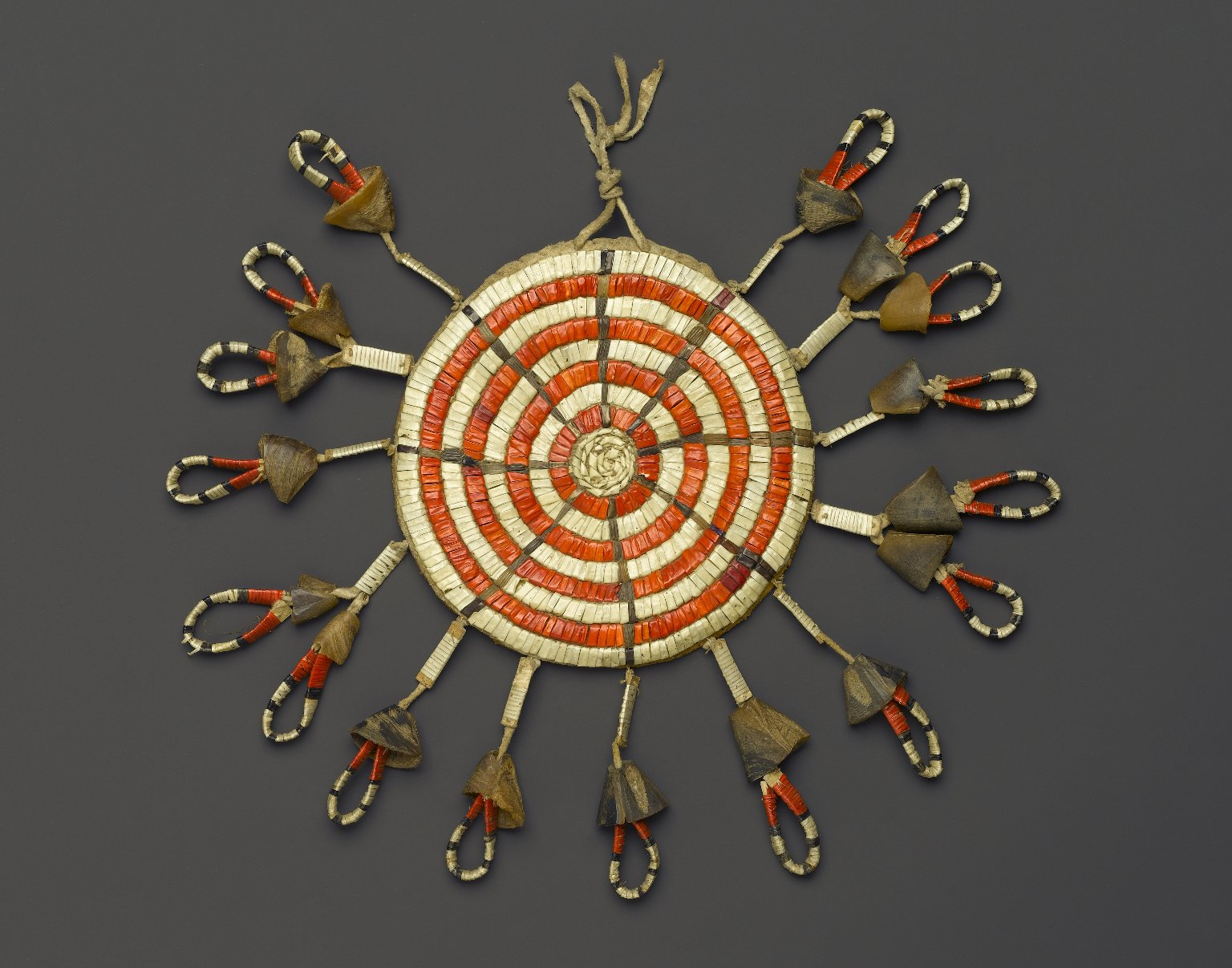
Pouch, Arapaho (Native American), late 19th or early 20th century, Brooklyn Museum

In the modern world, bags are ubiquitous, with many people routinely carrying a wide variety of them in the form of cloth or leather briefcases, handbags, and backpacks, and with bags made from more disposable materials such as paper or plastic being used for shopping or to carry groceries. Today, bags are also used as a fashion statement. A bag may be closable by a zipper, snap fastener, etc., or simply by folding (e.g. in the case of a paper bag). Sometimes, money bags or travel bags have a lock. The bag likely predates its inflexible variant, the basket, and usually has the additional advantage of being foldable or otherwise compressible to smaller sizes. On the other hand, baskets, being made of more rigid materials, may be better at protecting their contents.

An empty bag may or may not be very light and foldable to a small size. If it is, this is convenient for carrying it to the place where it is needed, such as a shop, and for storage of empty bags. Bags vary from small ones, like purses, to larger ones used for traveling, such as a suitcase. The pockets of clothing are also a kind of bag, built into the clothing for the carrying of suitably small objects.

== Environmental aspects ==
There are environmental concerns regarding use and disposal of single-use plastic bags. Efforts are being taken to control and reduce their use in some European Union countries, such as Ireland and the Netherlands. In some cases, these cheap bags are taxed, so the customer must pay a fee where they may not have done previously. Sometimes, heavy duty reusable plastic and fabric bags are sold, typically costing €0.50 to €1, and these may replace disposable bags entirely. Sometimes free replacements are offered when the bag wears out. The UK has charged 5p per plastic carrier bag in larger shops since 2015. This trend has spread to some cities in the United States. Recently many countries have banned the use of plastic bags. Paper bags emerge as a great replacement for plastic bags; however, paper bags tend to be more expensive.

A bag may or may not be disposable; however, even a disposable bag can often be used many times, for economic and environmental reasons. On the other hand, there may be logistic or hygienic reasons to use a bag only once. For example, a garbage bag is often disposed of with its contents. A bag for packaging a disposable product is often disposed of when empty. Similarly, bags used as receptacles in medical procedures, such as the colostomy bag used to collect waste from a surgically diverted biological system, are typically disposed of as medical waste. Many snack foods, such as pretzels, cookies, and potato chips, are available in disposable single-use sealed bags: Walmart bags can come in plastic or paper and plastic is made out of pta.

== Types ==
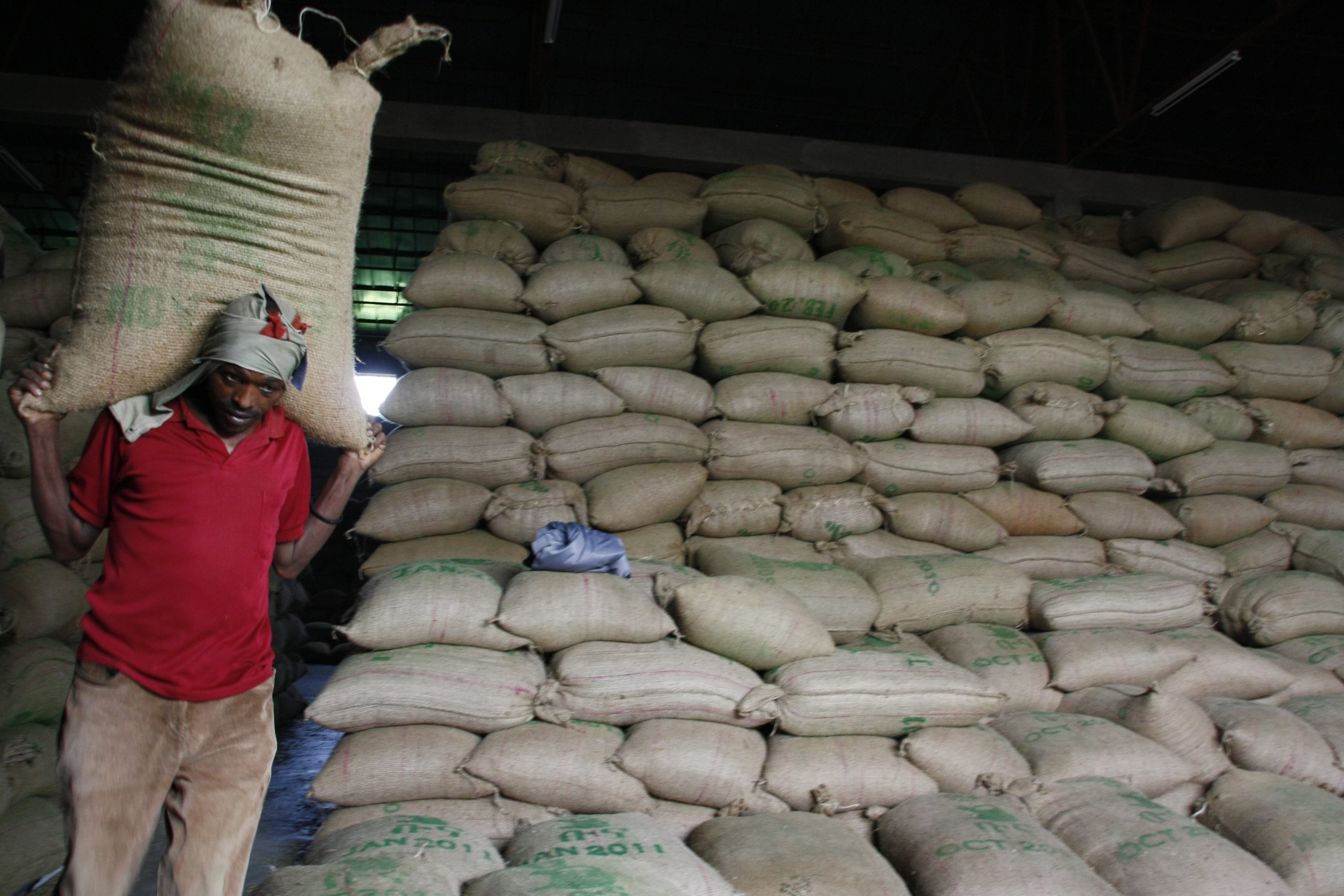
Jute bags (gunny sacks) of coffee

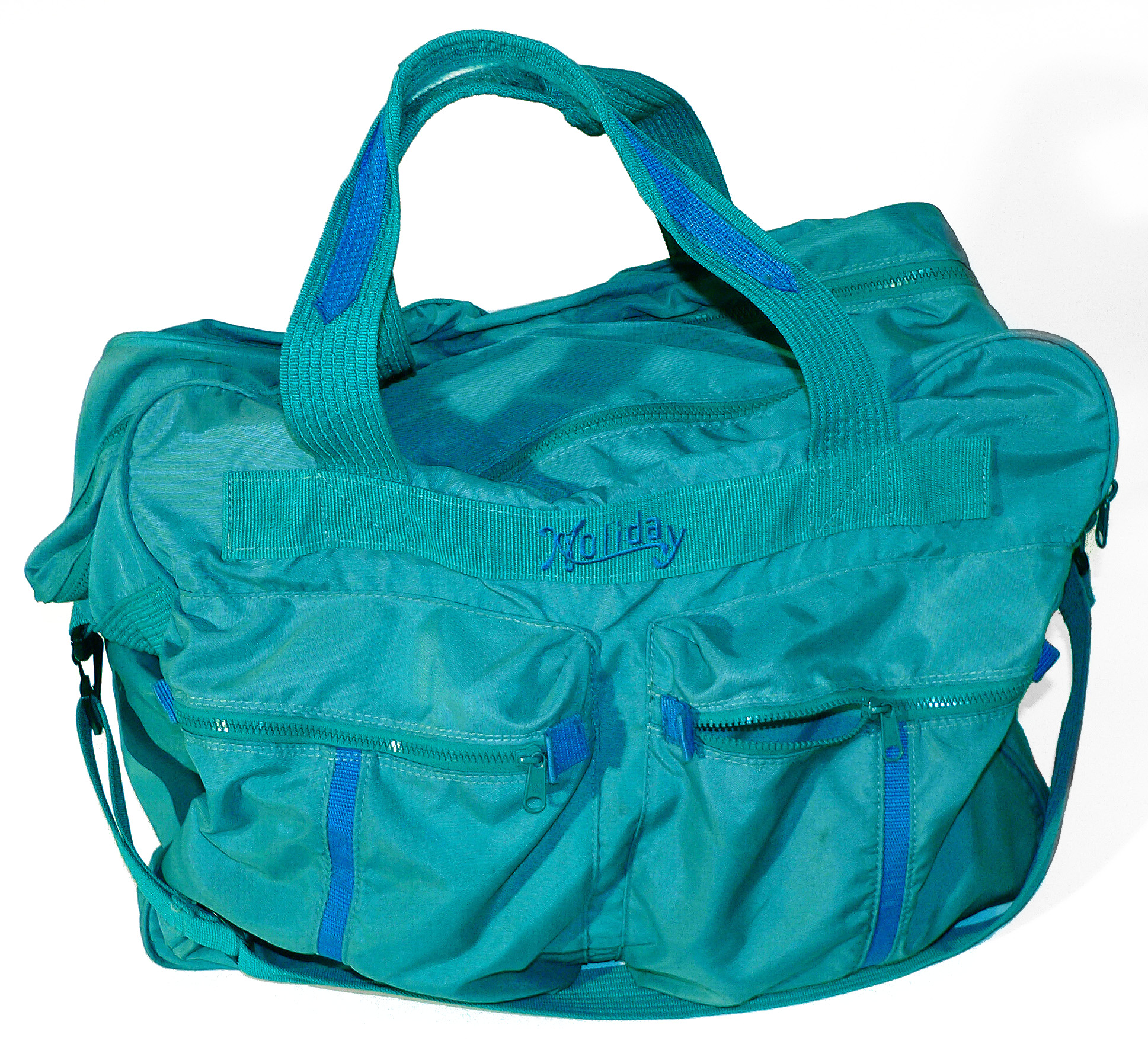
A modern bag for carrying personal belongings

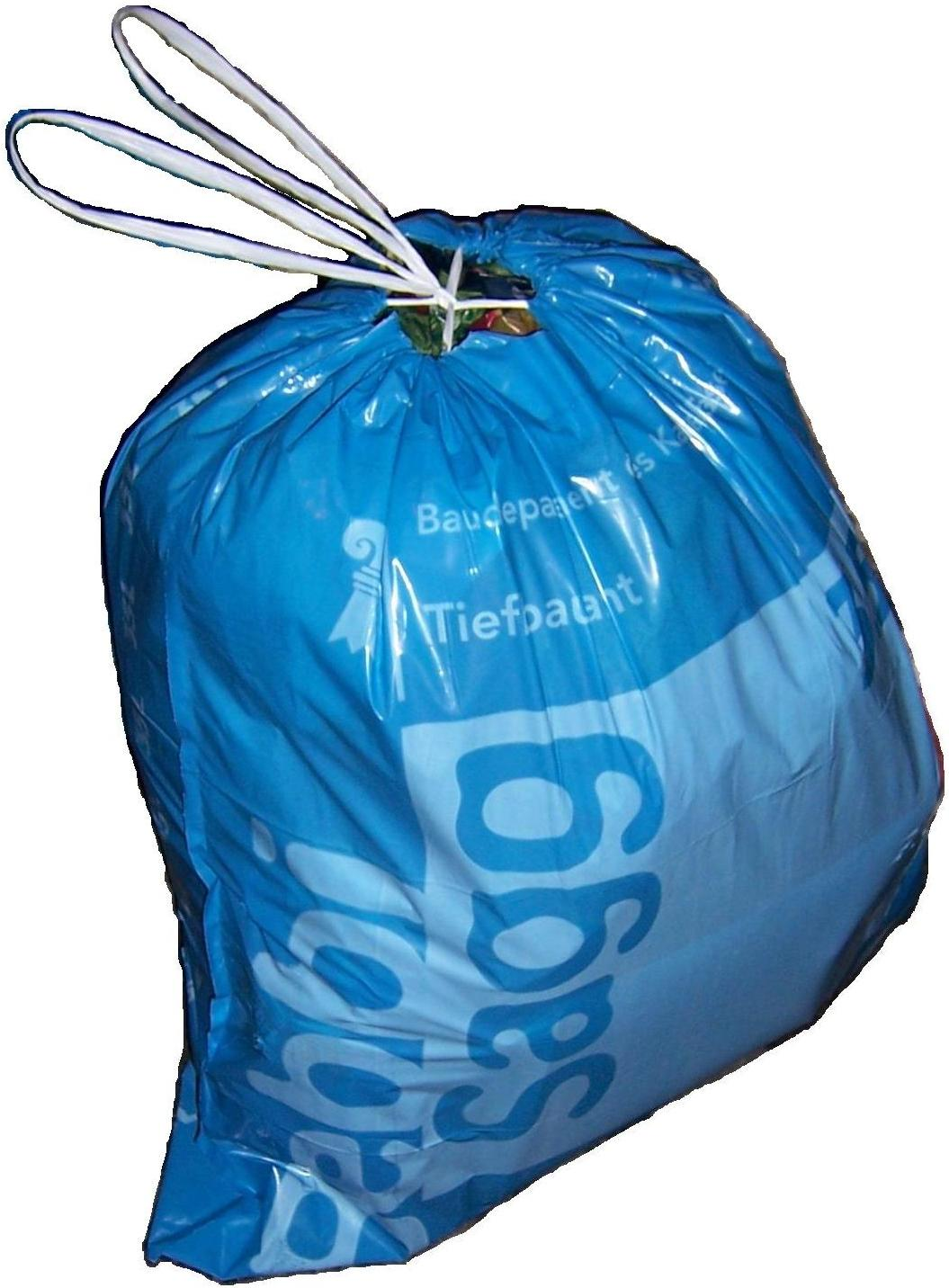
Official waste disposal bag from Basel, Switzerland

- Antistatic bag (used for shipping electronic components)
- Backpack
- Bag-in-box
- Baguette
- Bin bag, garbage bag, or trash bag
  - Blue bag
- Biodegradable bag
- Bivouac bag
- Body bag
- Book bag
- Booster bag
- Bota bag
- Bulk bag, another name for a flexible intermediate bulk container
- Burn bag
- Camera bag
- Carpet bag
- Cooler bag
- Cross-body bag
- Diaper bag
- Diplomatic bag
- Douche bag
- Duffel bag
- Dunnage bag
- Flour sack
- Gaji bag
- Garment bag
- Gladstone bag
- Gunny sack
- Handbag or purse
- Hobo bag
- Holdall
- Ita-bag
- Lifting bag
- Mail bag
- Medical bag
- Messenger bag
- Millbank bag
- Money bag
- Paper bag
- Plastic bag
- Popcorn bag
- Punching bag
- Sandbag
- Satchel
- Security bag
- Sling bag, worn over the shoulder
- Shopping bag
- Stuff sack
- Suicide bag
- Thermal bag
- Tote bag
- Travel bag or suitcase
- Tucker bag

== Other ==
- Airbag (vehicle safety device)
- Bagpipes
- Bag valve mask
- Bean bag
- Bag valve mask
- Bota bag
- Bulgarian Bag
- Coin purse
- Coffee bag
- Ita-bag
- Milk bag
- Oven bag
- Parfleche
- Pastry bag
- Punching bag (a piece of physical training equipment)
- Perhaps-bag or Netted sack
- Portable hyperbaric bag
- Raschen bag
- Sachet
- Sleeping bag
- Sonali Bag
- Spice bag
- Tea bag
- Vacuum bag
- Zipper storage bag

== See also ==
- Bag (unit of measurement with various values)
- Bagger
- Bagg (disambiguation)
- Bag tag
- Sack (disambiguation)
