= SS Prins Hendrik (1874) =

Dutch steam ship

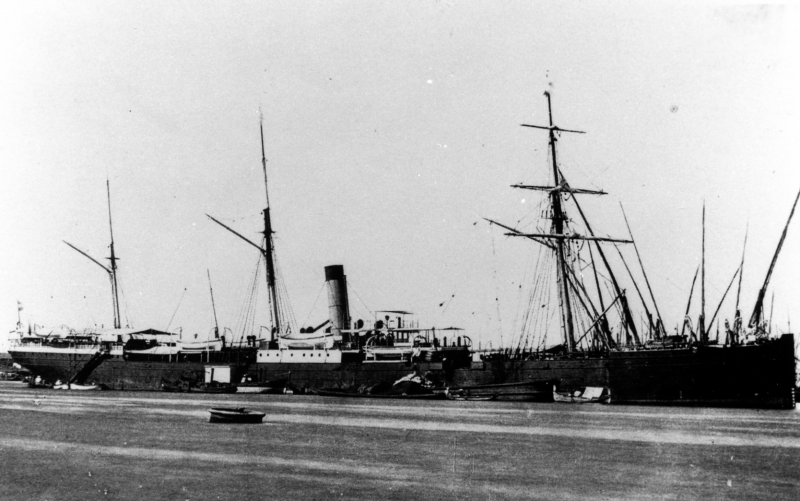
- SS Prins Hendrik

History

Netherlands
- Namesake: Prince Henry of the Netherlands
- Operator: Netherland Line
- Laid down: 31 January 1874
- Launched: 30 September 1874
- Decommissioned: 1 November 1886

British India
- Acquired: September 1887
- Decommissioned: 10 June 1897

General characteristics
- Type: Passenger liner
- Length: 368 ft (112.2 m)
- Beam: 37 ft 3 in (11.4 m)
- Draught: 25 feet 6 inches (7.8 m)
- Installed power: 1,600 ihp (1,200 kW)
- Sail plan: 3-masted
- Speed: 13 knots (24 km/h; 15 mph) (trial); 11 knots (20 km/h; 13 mph)

SS Prins Hendrik was a Dutch steam ship of the Netherland Line (Dutch Stoomvaart Maatschappij Nederland (SMN) or Netherlands Steamship Company)

== Ordering and construction ==
SS Prins Hendrik was built for Stoomvaart Maatschappij Nederland (SMN) by John Elder & Co. of Govan on the River Clyde. The order for the ship was caused by the disaster of a previous SS Prins Hendrik which sunk in the Red Sea on 27 September 1873. The decision to place this order in Glasgow was taken by mid October.

Prins Hendrik was laid down as yard number 232 at John Elder & Co in Gowan on 31 January 1874. She was launched on 30 September 1874. On 13 November 1874 she made her trial runs on the Clyde under Captain M.C. Braat, and reached 13 knots. On 18 November 1874 she left Greenock for Nieuwediep (Den Helder).

== Characteristics ==
=== Dimensions ===
Prins Hendrik was 368 feet (112 m) long, 37.25 feet (11.35 m) wide and had a draught of 25 feet 5 inches (7.75 m). The cargo size of the ship was 2,804 gross register tons (GRT).

=== Machinery ===
The compound steam engines were also delivered by the shipyard. The indicated power of the engines was 1,600 indicated horsepower (1,200 kW). There were two double-ended Scotch boilers with six furnaces each. The engine drove a single screw.

=== Accommodation ===
Prins Hendrik had place for 70 first class passengers and 22 second class passengers.

== Service ==
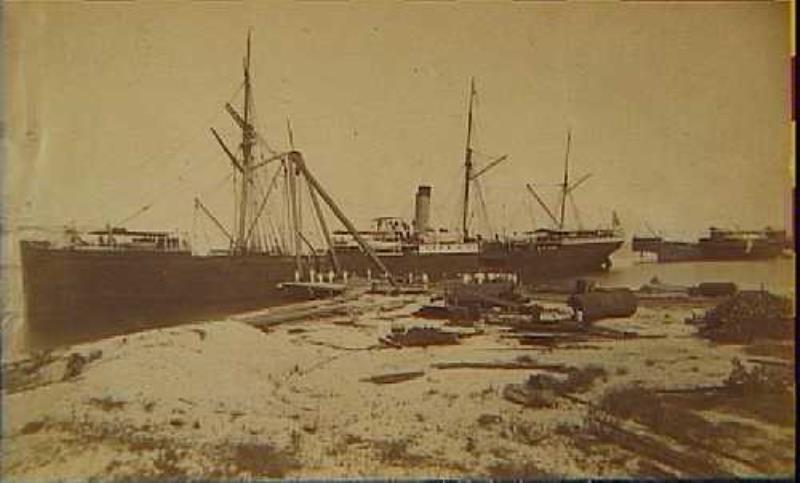
At Amsterdam Island (Ind.) in June 1878.

On 13 October 1886 Prins Hendrik left Batavia for Amsterdam, having a draught of 20 feet (6.1 m) at the bow and 21 feet (6.4 m) at the stern. In the afternoon of 31 October she arrived at Aden and anchored as close to shore as possible. 40 minutes past midnight bunkering was complete. The anchor was lifted, and the ship slowly steamed backward. She did not see the English SS Hubbuck, which had heard the three blows of the steam whistle, but could not change course in time, and hit her starboard stern somewhat before the mizzen mast. Prins Hendrik was ripped open, and the water streamed through a vertical hole of 24 feet (7.3 m) high, and 7 feet (2.1 m) wide near the upper deck. At first the front cargo hold stayed water tight, but when the cargo in the aft started to swell, the ship burst at several places, and this hold was also filled with water.

After the collision Prins Hendrik anchored again and immediately disembarked passengers and the mail. Attempts to keep the ship afloat failed. the rear hold and engine and boiler rooms were soon full of water, and at seven o'clock in the morning there was 5 feet (1.5 m) of water in the main cargo hold. By 12 o'clock 3,000 coffee bags had been unloaded from the front cargo hold. 2,000 bags unloaded later were completely wet. At flood the upper deck of Prins Hendrik was under water. At ebb the deck was a bit above water. Recovery work was rather quick, by mid October the ship was higher above the water, and had been berthed in shallower water. On 29 June 1887 the Admiralty court in London put the blame for the accident solely on Prins Hendrik.

Attempts to sell what was left of Prins Hendrik in a public auction in London failed. She was sold underhand in early September to Wizram Ebraim & Co from Bombay, India. She was then renamed Sultan.

== Fate ==
While sailing from As-Salif in Yemen to Kolkata Sultan was wrecked 100 miles (160 km) east of Socotra on 10 June 1897.
