= Bag (unit) =

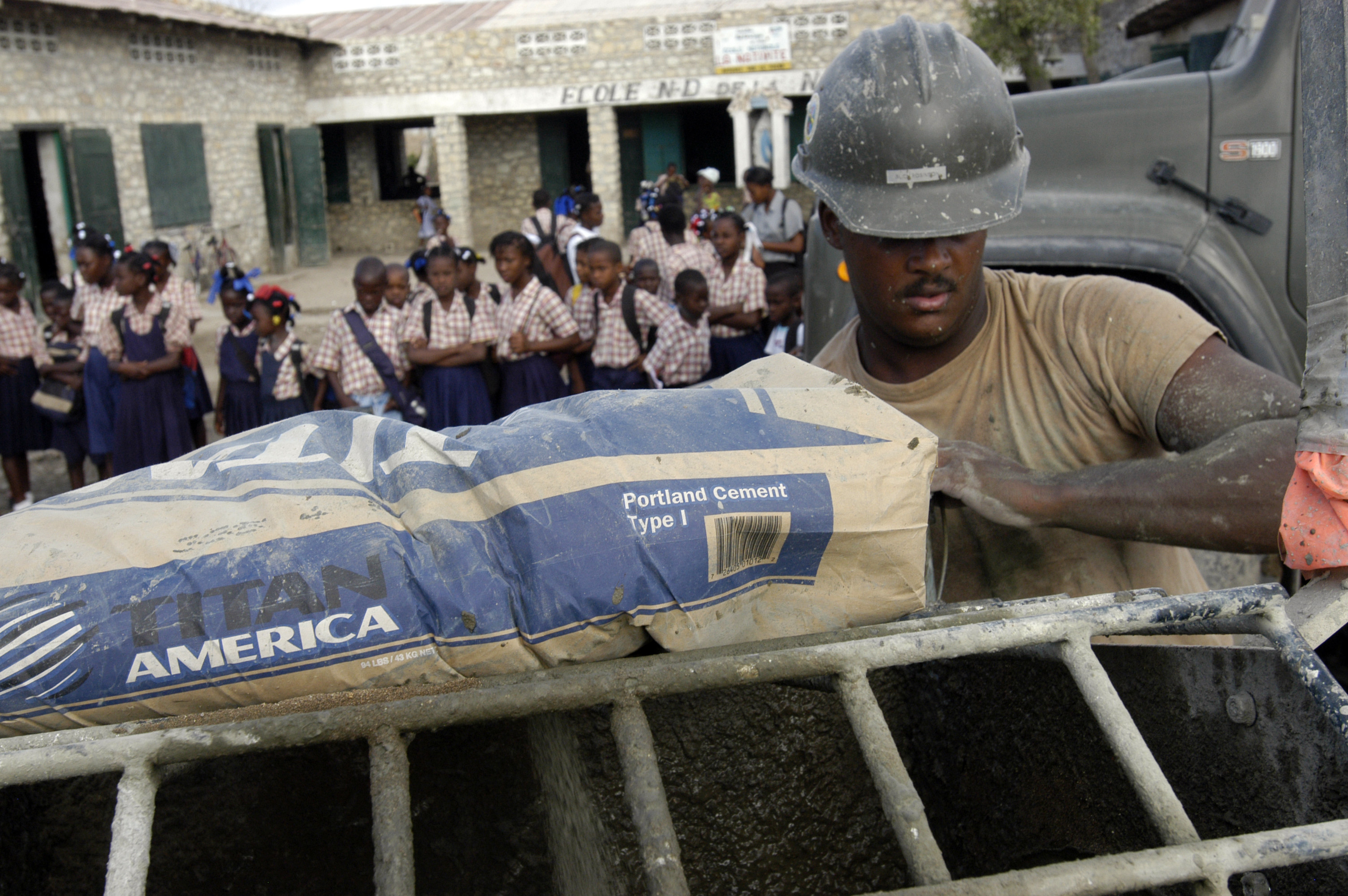

Bags have been used as standard measures for a variety of commodities which were actually supplied in bags or sacks. These include:

- Cement is commonly sold in bags of 94 pounds weight, because this is about 1 cubic foot of powdered cement.
- Agricultural produce in England was sold in bags which varied in capacity depending on the place and the commodity. Examples include:

- a bag of wheat in Staffordshire would contain 3 Winchester bushels while a bag of oats would contain 6 standard bushels.
- in the West Country, apples would be sold in bags of from 16 to 24 gallons. A measure of 24 gallons was known as the Cornish bushel.

- Bags are used as units by the National Agricultural Statistics Service of the United States Department of Agriculture for the following commodities:

- coffee = 60 kg
- flour = 100 pounds
- grapefruit = 40 pounds
- rice = 100 pounds

The Oxford English Dictionary has a definition of "bag" as "A measure of quantity for produce, varying according to the nature of the commodity" and has quotations illustrating its use for hops in 1679, almonds in 1728 (where it is defined by weight as "about 3 Hundred Weight" i.e. 336 pounds (152 kg) in Imperial units) and potatoes in 1845 (where it is a volume measure of "three bushels" - i.e. 24 imperial gallons (110 L)).
