= Beggar's chicken =

Chicken dish from China

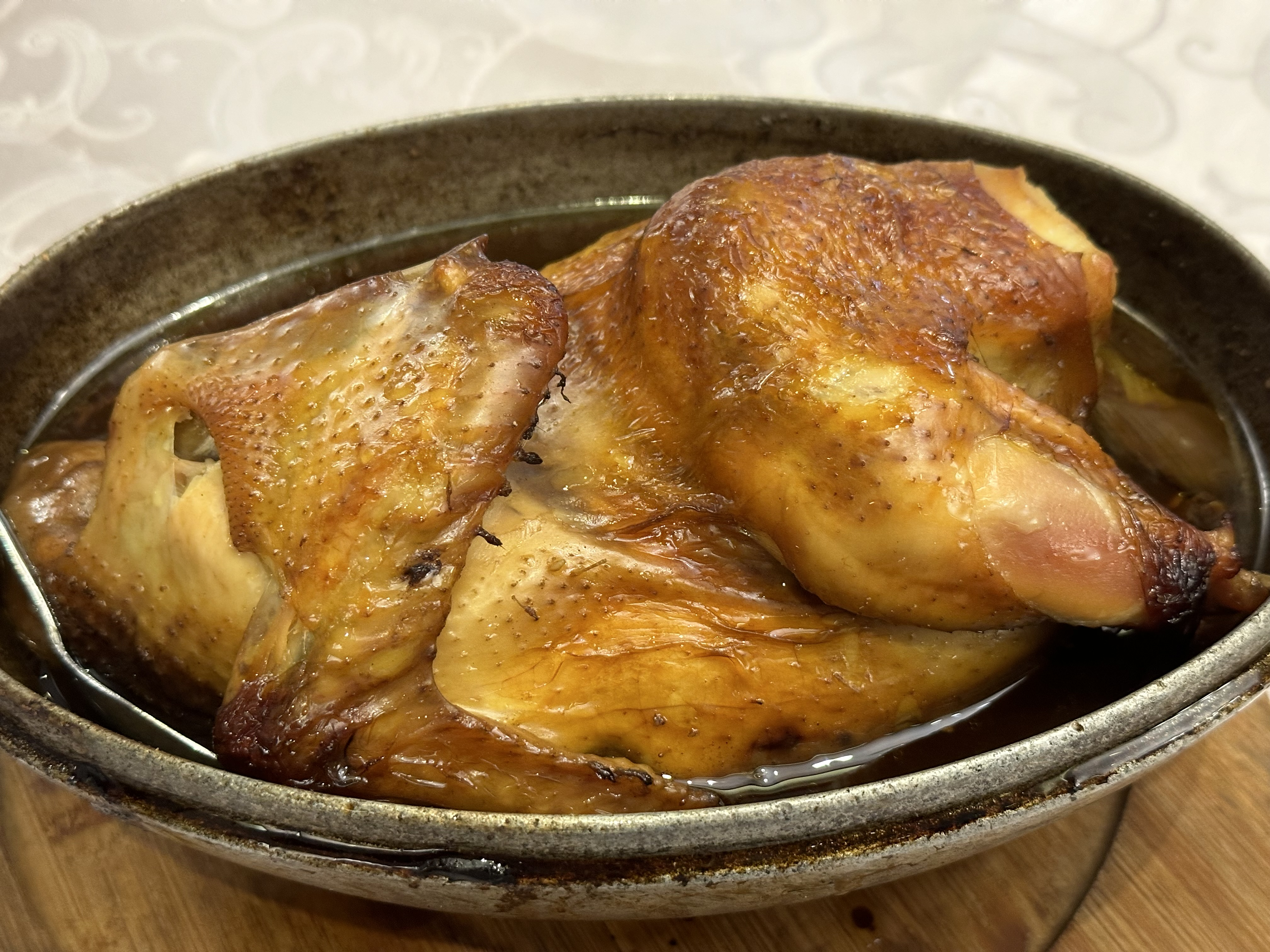
- Alternative names: Rich and noble chicken Baked stuffed chicken Hangzhou simmer chicken Yellow mud simmer chicken Foiled chicken (a simplified version)
- Type: Stuffed chicken dish
- Place of origin: China
- Region or state: Changshu, Jiangsu province
- Main ingredients: Chicken, marinade, and stuffing with variety of ingredients

Beggar's chicken
- Simplified Chinese: 叫化鸡
- Traditional Chinese: 叫化雞
- Hanyu Pinyin: jiàohuā jī
- Literal meaning: beggar's chicken
Transcriptions
Standard Mandarin
- Hanyu Pinyin: jiàohuā jī
Wu
- Romanization: ciau ho ci

Beggar's chicken (simplified Chinese: 叫化鸡; traditional Chinese: 叫化雞; pinyin: jiàohuā jī) is a Chinese dish of chicken that is stuffed, wrapped in clay and lotus leaves (or banana or bamboo leaves as alternatives), and baked slowly using low heat. Preparation of a single portion may take up to six hours. Although the dish is traditionally prepared with clay, the recipe has evolved; for convenience and safety it is often baked with dough, oven bags, ceramic cooking pots, or convection ovens.

== Origin ==
Beggar's chicken is very popular in China, with many regions claiming it as traditionally their own. Most experts agree the dish originated in Hangzhou. The clay-wrapped method of slow cooking is thousands of years old.

Various legends surround the origins of beggar's chicken. In one, a beggar stole a chicken from a farm but having no pot or utensils, he wrapped the bird in lotus leaves and packed clay or mud around it, set it in a hole where he had lit a fire, and buried it. When he dug up the chicken and cracked open the clay, he found the meat was tender and aromatic. In other versions, the beggar stole the chicken from the emperor and used the mud-hole method to avoid smoke that might attract the imperial guards. Alternatively, the emperor stopped to dine with the beggar and so enjoyed the dish that he added it to the imperial menu and the beggar prospered by selling the dish to locals. In another legend, the dish was a childhood favorite of Emperor Gaozu of Han, who had been born a peasant. When he became emperor, the recipe became an imperial specialty. Finally, in another legend tells us that, during the 17th century toward the end of the Ming dynasty in Changshu, politician and Koxinga's mentor Qian Qianyi met the beggar who made the impromptu dish and had his chefs improve the recipe.

== Preparation ==
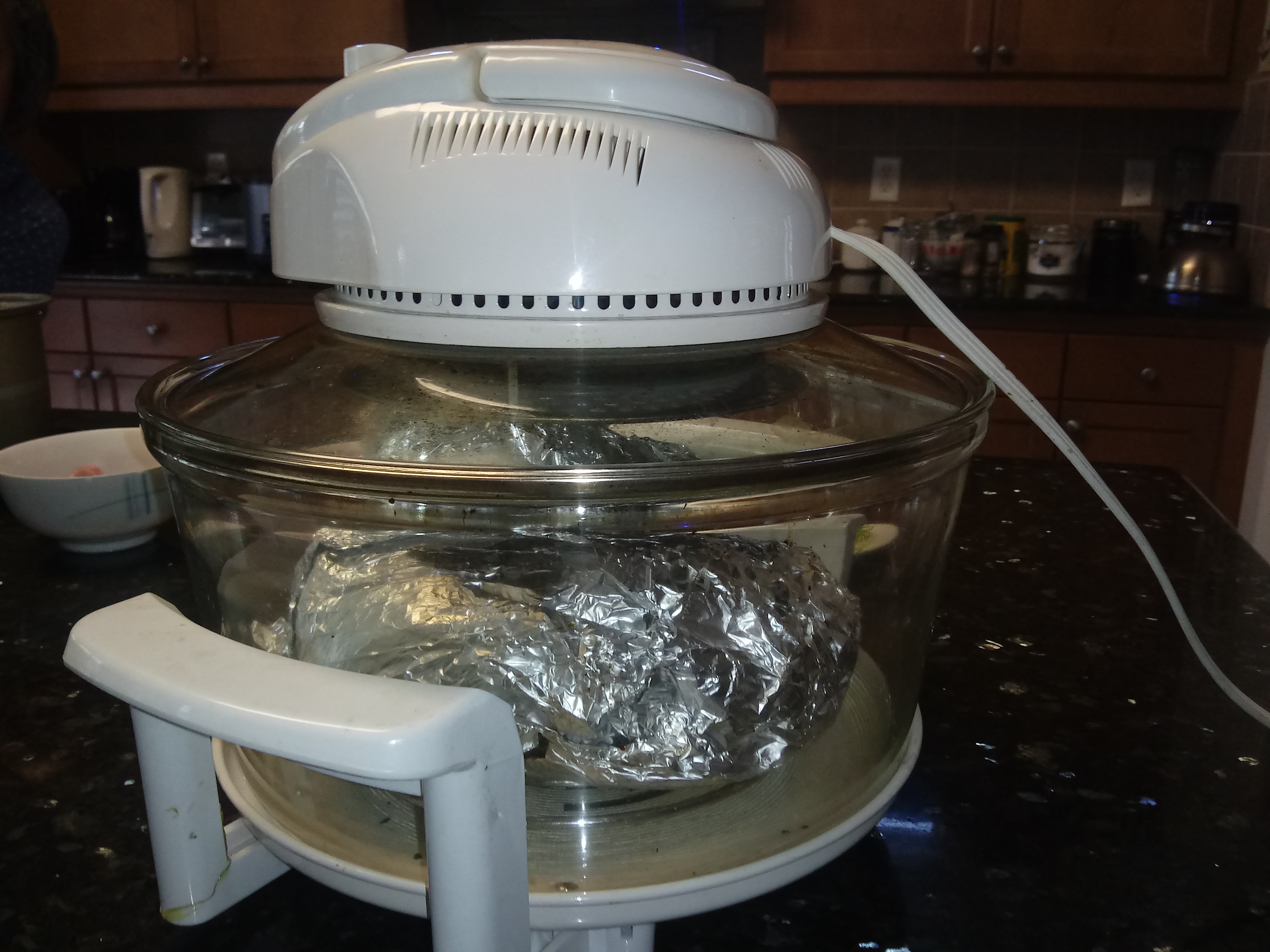
A foil-wrapped beggar's chicken, being cooked alternatively in a contemporary convection oven instead of traditionally covered in non-toxic clay or dough and baked in a typical cooking oven or an outdoor smoker, in a Chinese American home in California.

Today, dough is sometimes substituted for clay for the dish's preparation, though some recipes still call for a covering of non-toxic clay to retain moisture, and stuffed with various ingredients. It can be prepared in ovens, outdoor grills and smokers, and campfires. Non-toxic clay for preparing beggar's chicken can be obtained from hardware or arts and craft stores; however, cooks must pay attention when baking the dish with clay because if too much heat is used, "the earth may crack and it can be very dangerous" due to the pressure buildup in the clay shell. Preparing the dish with dough is safer and inexpensive; ceramic cooking pots can also be used to retain moisture, but these are expensive to purchase. Alternatively, an oven bag can be used when cooking it in a domestic oven.

A convection oven can eliminate the need to cover the dish and allows it to cook evenly, but the chicken should still be wrapped with lotus leaves and sheets of aluminum foil, and would be ready in less time than in an electric oven. This simplified version of the dish is also called "foiled chicken".

== See also ==
- List of chicken dishes
