= Bin bag =

Disposable bag used to contain solid waste material

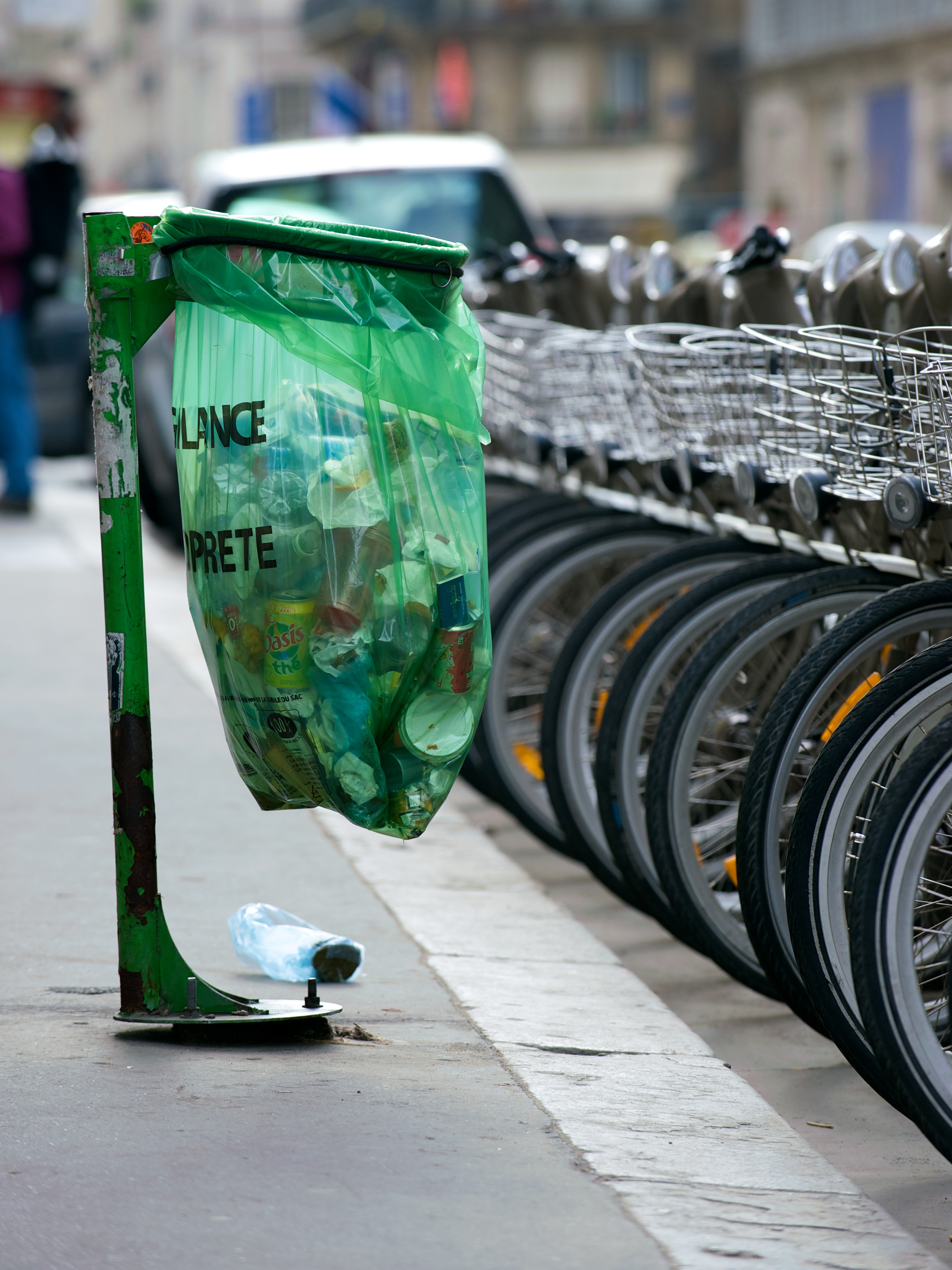
A public waste bag in Paris displaying the inscription "Vigilance - Propreté" ("Vigilance - cleanliness")

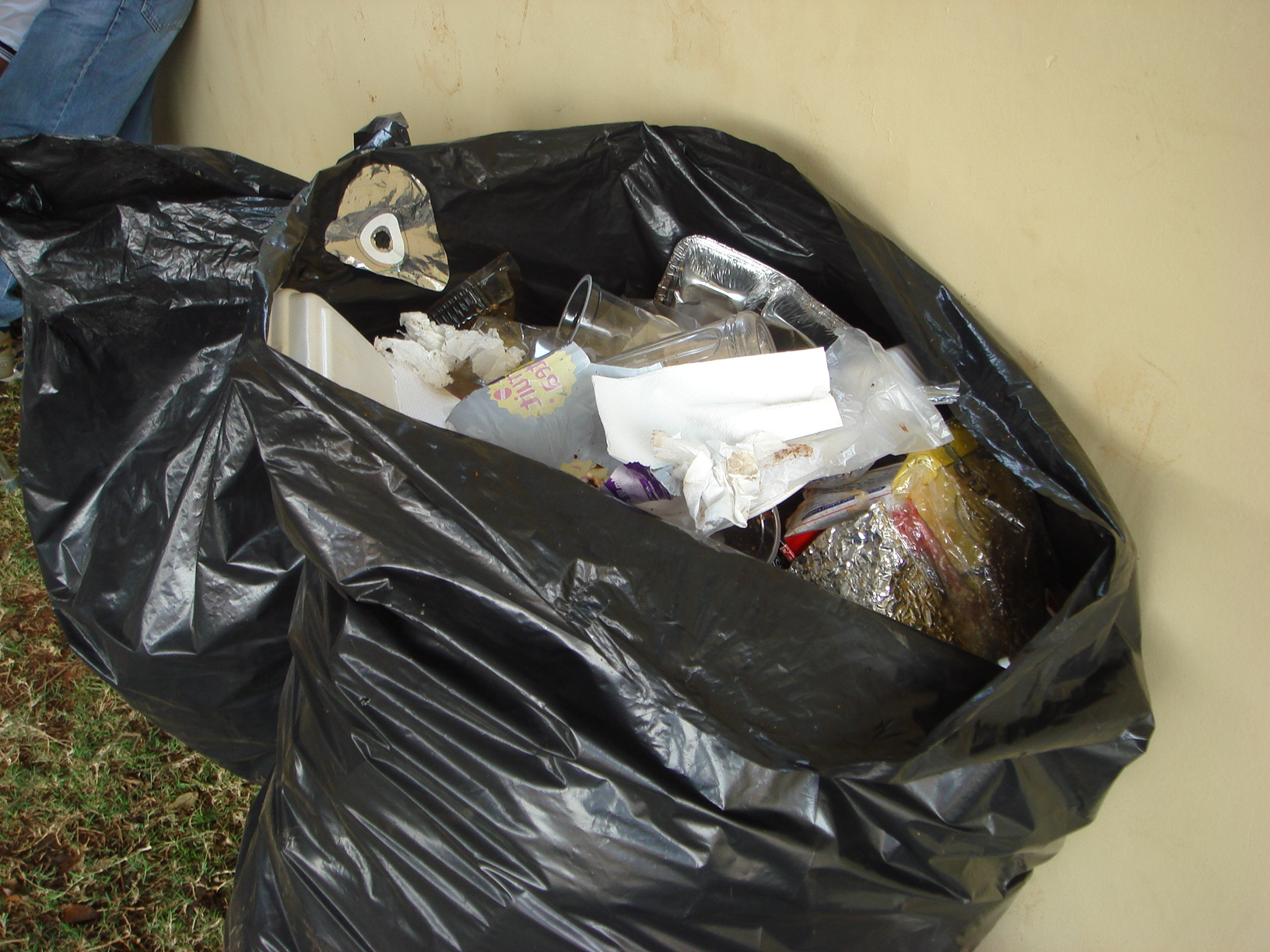
A typical black bin bag from the United Kingdom

A bin bag, rubbish bag (British English), garbage bag, bin liner, trash bag (American English) or refuse sack is a disposable receptable for solid waste. These bags are useful to line the insides of waste containers to prevent the insides of the container from becoming coated in waste material. Most bags today are made out of plastic, and are typically black, white, or green in color.

Plastic bags are a widely used, convenient, and sanitary way of handling garbage. Plastic garbage bags are fairly lightweight and are particularly useful for messy or wet rubbish, as is commonly the case with food waste, and are also useful for wrapping up garbage to minimize odor. Plastic bags are often used for lining litter or waste containers or bins. This keeps the container sanitary by avoiding container contact with the garbage. After the bag in the container is filled with litter, the bag can be pulled out by its edges, closed, and tied with minimal contact with the waste matter.

Garbage bags were invented by Canadians Harry Wasylyk, Larry Hansen and Frank Plomp in 1950. In a special on CBC Television, green garbage bags (first bin bags in Canada) ranked 36th among the top 50 Canadian inventions. Black plastic bags were introduced in 1950 as star sealed bags. The first bags in the United States were green and black, rather than the now-common white and clear. Flat-sealed bags first appeared in 1959. In the 1960s, the white bin bags were introduced. Two-ply (Heavy Duty) bags were introduced in 1974, with 3 ply bags following in 1980.

Plastic bags can be incinerated with their contents in appropriate facilities for waste-to-energy conversion. They are stable and benign in sanitary landfills; some are degradable under specified conditions.

== Description ==
Plastic bags for rubbish or litter are sold in a significant number of sizes at many stores in packets or rolls of a few tens of bags. Wire twist ties are sometimes supplied for closing the bag once full. Varying thicknesses are commonly manufactured - thicker bags are used for heavy-duty applications such as construction waste, or in order to be able to withstand being compacted during recycling processes. In the mid-1990s bin bags with drawstrings for closure were introduced. Some bags have handles that may be tied or holes through which the neck of the bag can be pulled. Most commonly, the plastic used to make bin bags is the rather soft and flexible LDPE (low-density polyethylene) or, for strength, LLDPE (linear low-density polyethylene) or HDPE (high-density polyethylene) are sometimes used.

=== Biodegradable plastic bags ===
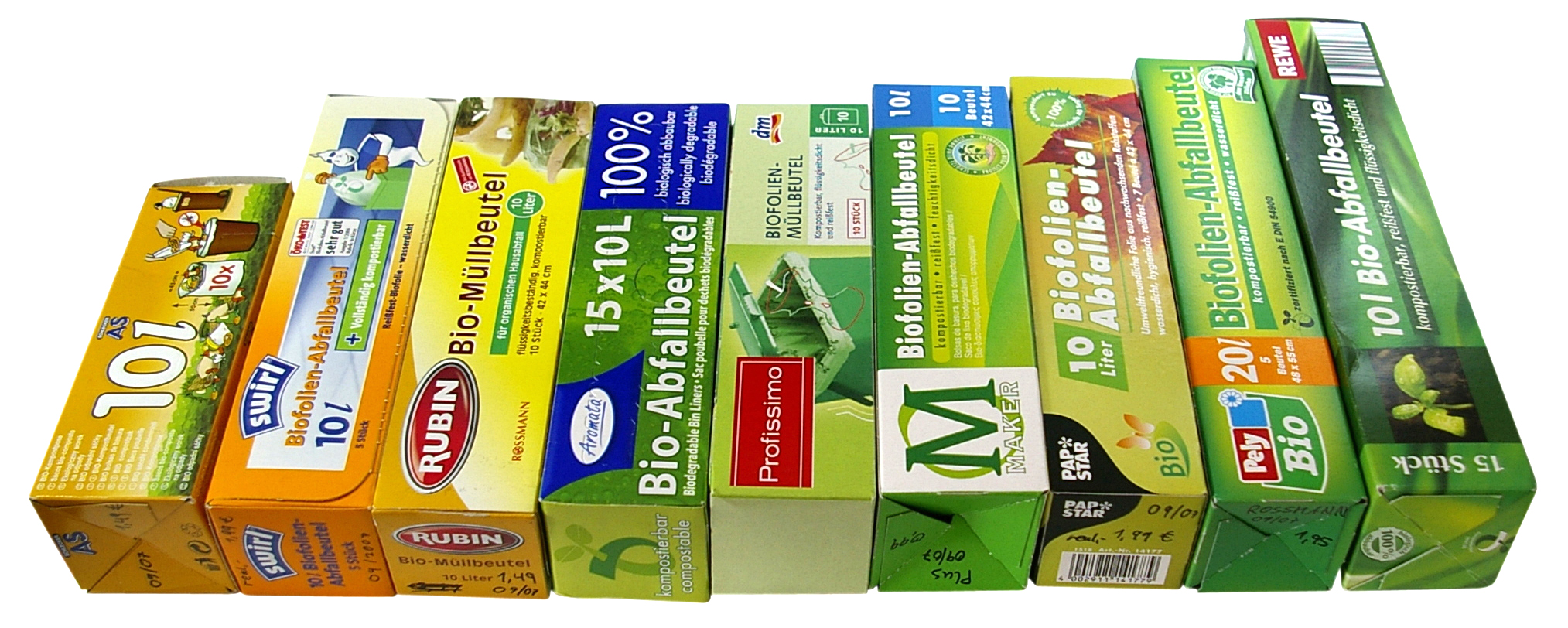
Garbage bags made from bioplastics and other biodegradable plastics

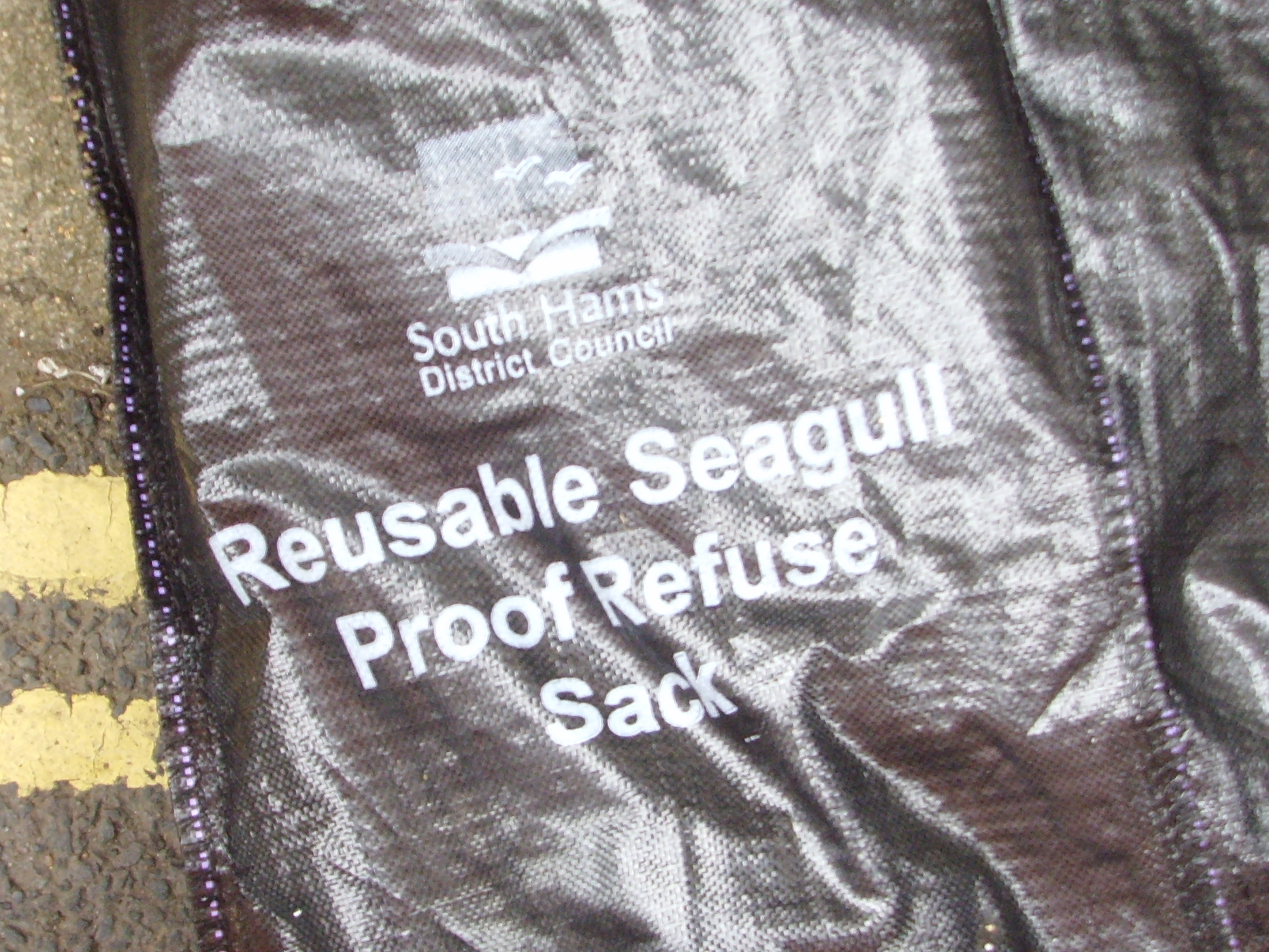
A bin bag designed to resist vermin. United Kingdom

Oxo-biodegradable plastic bags have the same strength as ordinary plastic and cost slightly more. They will degrade then biodegrade if they get into the open environment, but they can be recycled if collected during their useful life. They are designed so that they will not degrade deep in landfills and will not, therefore, generate methane. Oxo-biodegradable plastic does not degrade quickly in low temperature "windrow" composting, but it is suitable for "in-vessel" composting at the higher temperatures required by the animal by-products regulations. Oxo-biodegradable plastic is bio-assimilated by the same bacteria and fungi, which transform natural material such as twigs and leaves to cell biomass, like lignocellulosic materials. Oxo-biodegradable plastic is designed to degrade initially by a process that includes both photo-oxidation and thermo-oxidation, so it can degrade in the dark. Resin identification code 7 is applicable to biodegradable plastics.

=== Drawstring and flexibility ===
In 1984, drawstring garbage bags first appeared before GLAD and Hefty introduced them. In August 2001, Hefty introduced the garbage bags with a drawstring designed to stretch around the garbage can's rim and stay in place. In July 2004, ForceFlex, the flexible plastic garbage bags, was introduced by GLAD (followed by Hefty's Ultra Flex brand in September).

== See also ==
- Blue bag
- Packaging
- Plastic bag
- Plastic recycling
- Thermal depolymerization, post consumer waste processing technologies
