= Gaji bag =

Large, open-topped hand bag

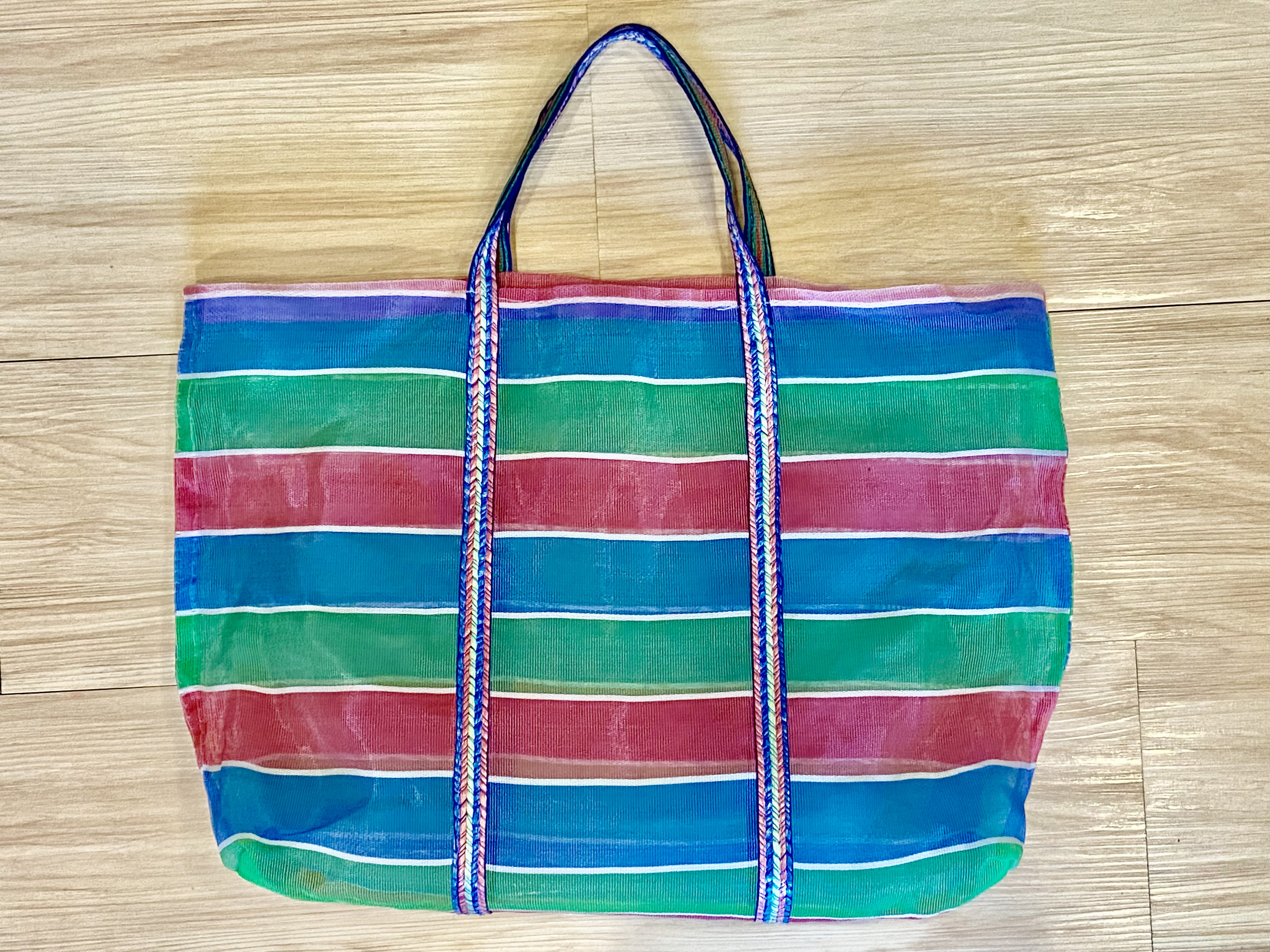
Gaji bag

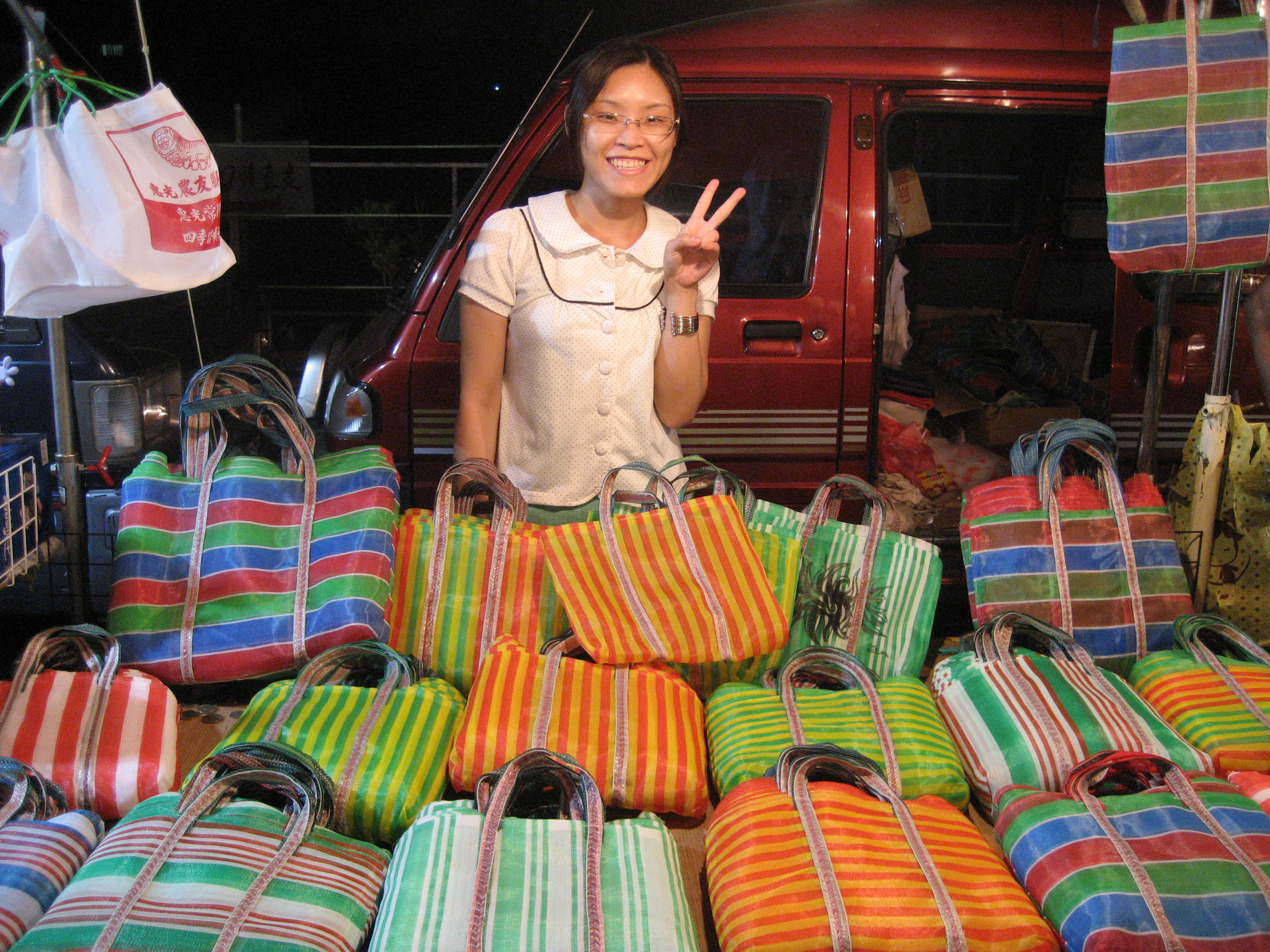
Gaji bag vendor at a night market in Tainan.

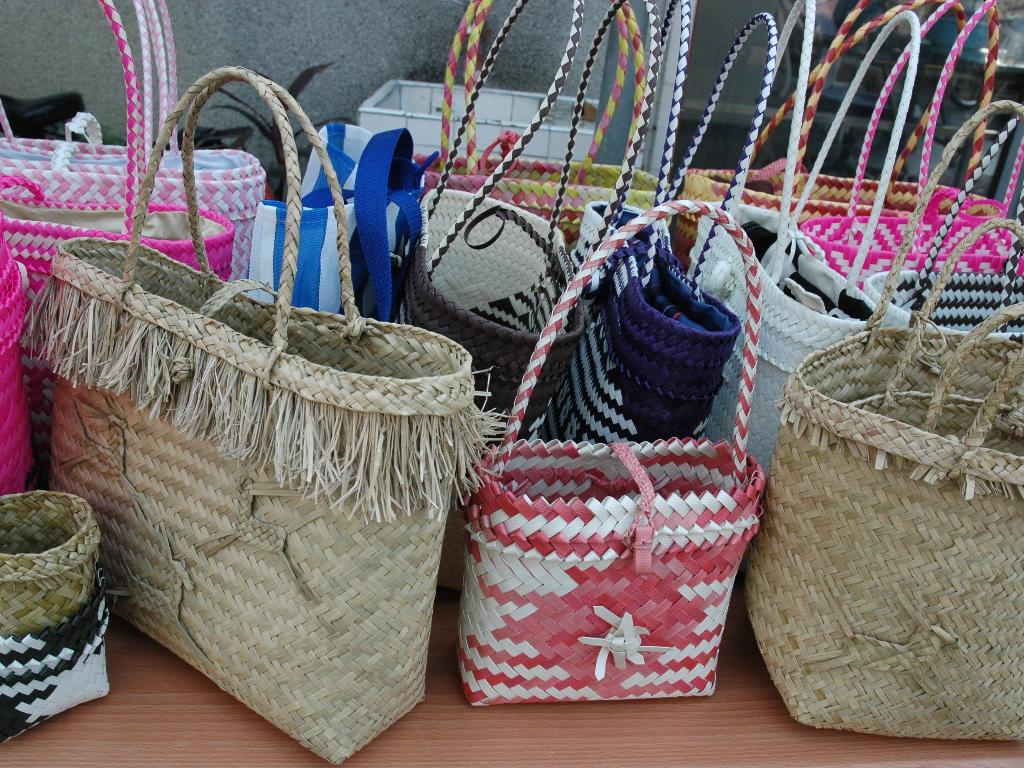
Houbu Community Development Association and Qiezhi Grandma's Workshop (also known as "Qiezhi Workshop") introduced innovative thinking and enhanced local awareness, giving Qiezhi bags a new definition. Qiezhi bags have undergone several transformations, including: using more durable packing straps for weaving, resulting in sturdy and elegant finished products; making mesh bags with more colorful stripes; combining different materials and fabrics; small storage bags of various sizes and styles

A gaji bag (Chinese: 茄芷袋; Tongyong Pinyin: jiājhǐ dài; Tâi-lô: ka-tsì-á) is a large, typically unfastened bag with parallel handles that emerge from the sides of its pouch. They are often used as reusable shopping bags. Gaji bags originated from the rural village of Jingliao in the Houbi District of Tainan, Taiwan during the Japanese colonial period.

== History ==
Initially woven by rice farmers seeking extra income, these bags were crafted from Cyperus malaccensis, a plant abundant in nearby marshes. Though grass weaving techniques are found around the world, Taiwan's rushwork is quite unique. It makes use of Schoenoplectus triqueter grown in the area north of the Da'an and south of the Yuanli rivers. It is called "mat grass" in Taiwanese, 草蓆 (cǎoxí) in Mandarin, and triangular club-rush in English (though botanically it is neither a rush nor a grass, but a sedge).

Taiwanese club-rush's toughness, resistance to sun damage, breathability, unique scent, and beautiful coloration (with varying shades of green, yellow and brown after exposure to the sun), as well as the exquisite techniques of weavers here, made the island's rushwork products widely treasured. The colonial Japanese government established an industrial association to manage the export of rush hats.

During Taiwan's industrialisation in the 1960s, gaji bags transitioned from plant to machine-sewn nylon mesh, offering higher durability and affordability. Thus, gaji bags became popular Taiwanese household items due to their practicality, used by mothers for grocery shopping and farmers for harvests. However, they faced a decline in the 1980s among younger consumers seeking more fashionable alternatives.

== Resurgence ==
The resurgence of gaji bags began in the early-mid 2000s, after the documentary film Let It Be released in 2004 highlighted the resilience of Jingliao farmers, while a famous singer adopting the gaji bag as a logo further boosted its popularity.

Today, gaji bags have evolved beyond traditional handbags, with designers incorporating the nylon mesh into various products. Available in a range of colours and styles, they appeal to both older generations, valuing heritage, and younger generations appreciating retro-chic aesthetics as well as foreign travellers to Taiwan. Locals also often jokingly call them the ‘Taiwan LV’ bag (like Louis Vuitton but much cheaper).

== See also ==
- Flight bag
