= Harry Wasylyk =

Inventor of the disposable garbage bag

Harry Wasylyk Sr. (November 1904 – September 1995) was a Canadian inventor from Winnipeg, Manitoba, who together with Larry Hanson of Lindsay, Ontario, invented the disposable polyethylene garbage bag in 1950. Garbage bags were first intended for commercial use rather than home use – the bags were first sold to the Winnipeg General Hospital. However, Hanson worked for the Union Carbide Company in Lindsay, which bought the invention from Wasylyk and Hanson. Union Carbide manufactured the first green garbage bags, marketed under the name Glad garbage bags for home use in the late 1960s.

== External links and sources ==
- Who Invented the Green Garbage Bag?
- Memorable Manitobans: Harry Wasylyk
