= Gunny sack =

Large bag made of rough fiber, often used for storage and transport

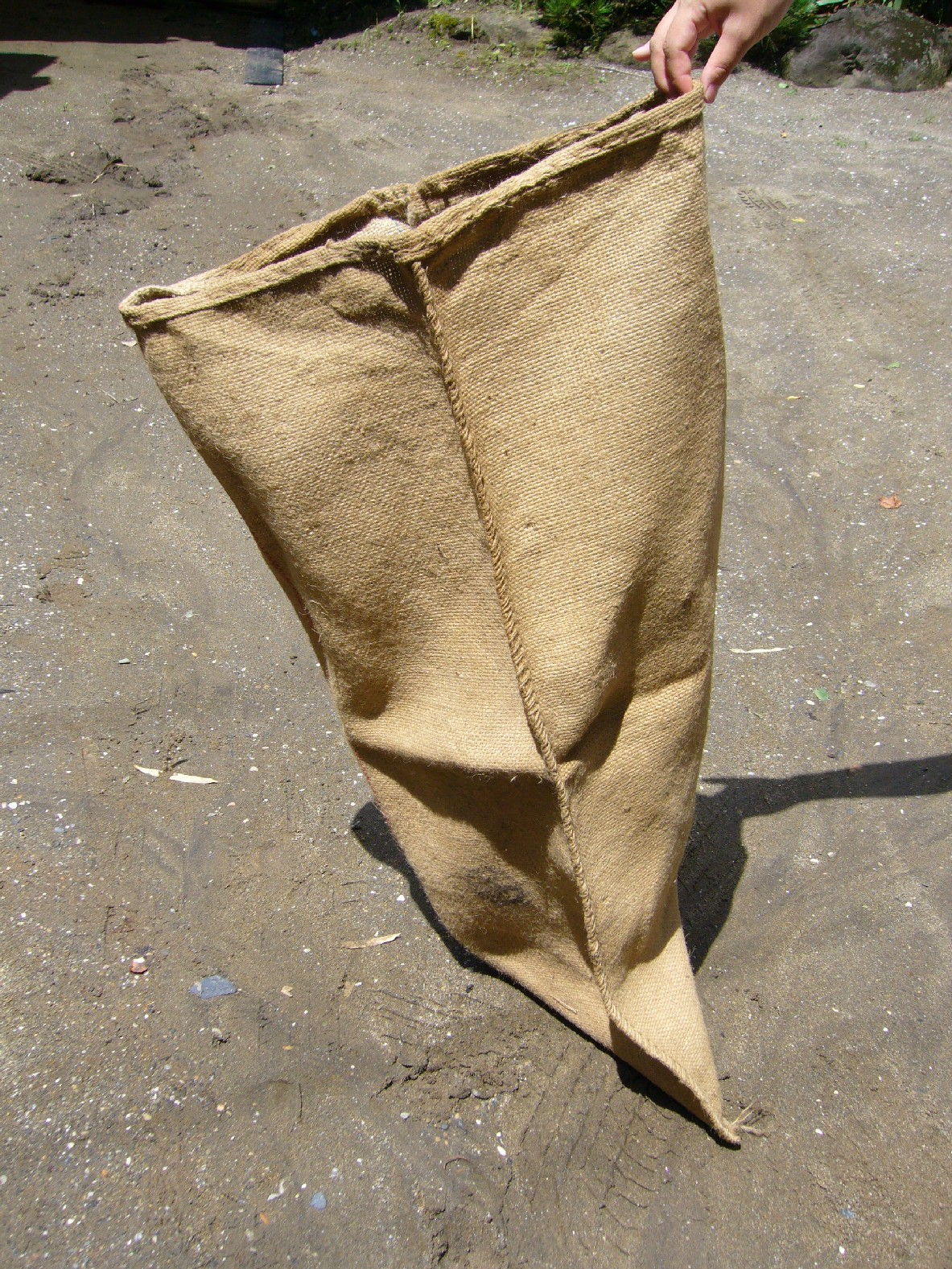
Sack made from hemp burlap

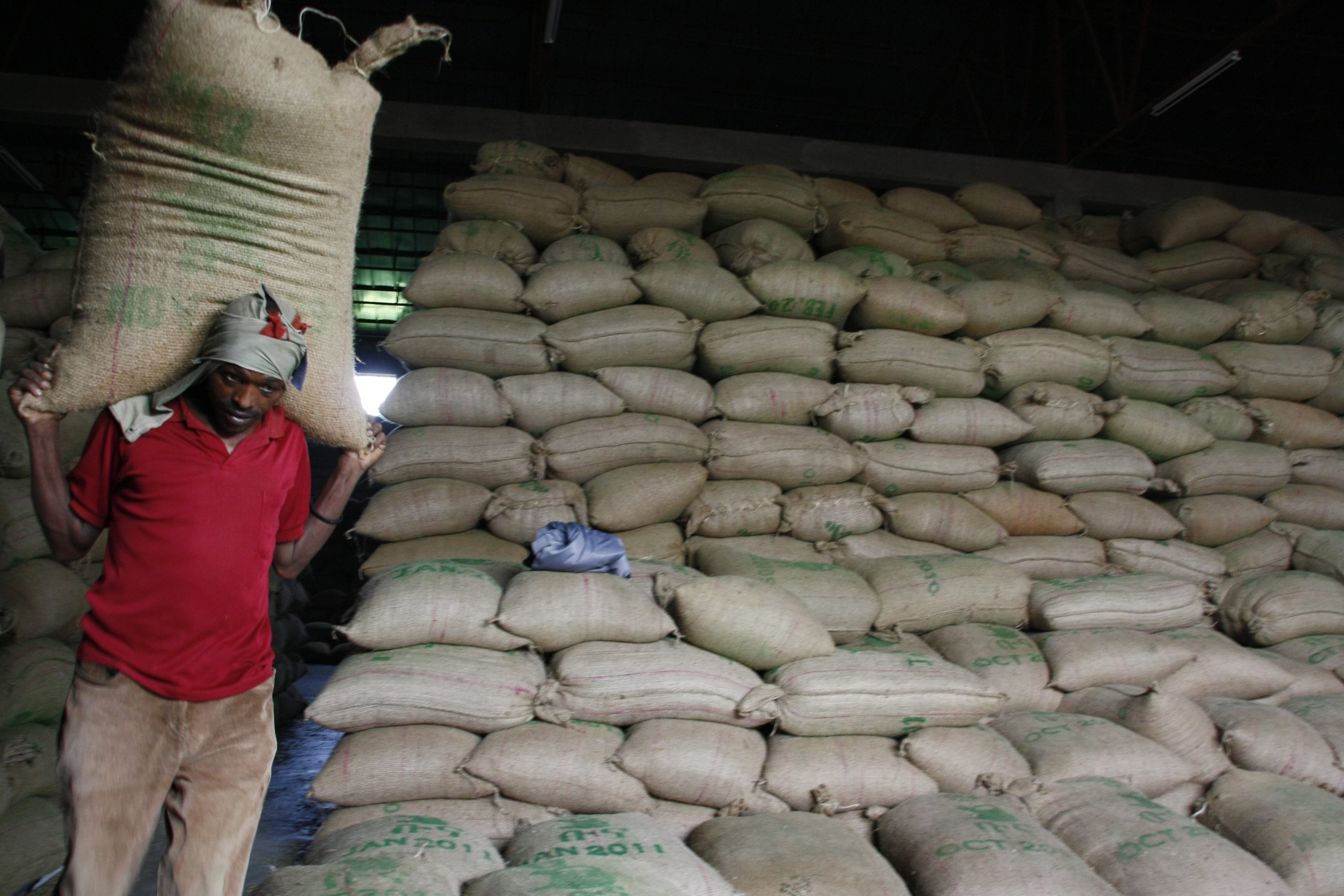
Stacks of coffee bags, Ethiopia

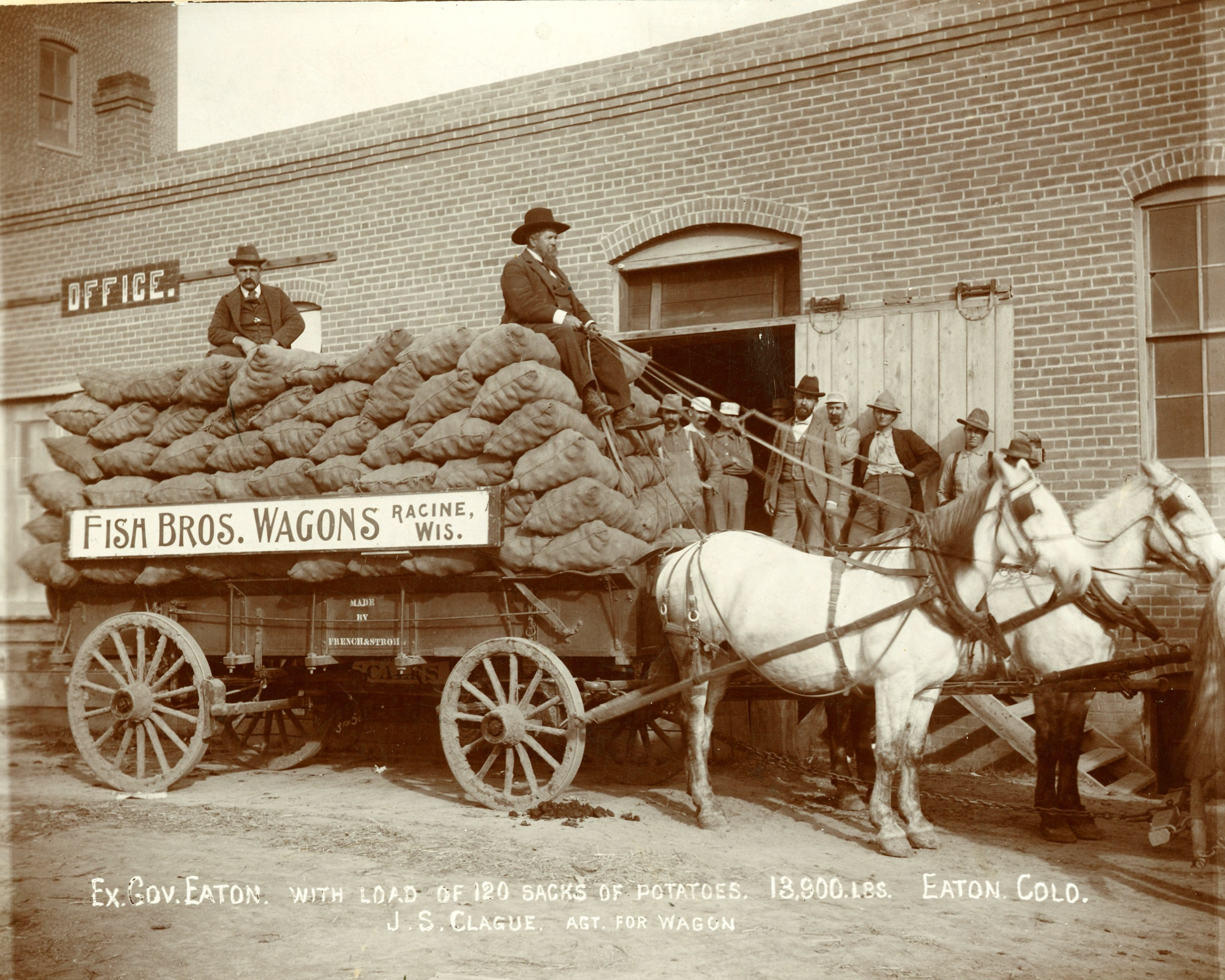
Potato sacks transported by horses in Colorado, 1890s

A gunny sack, also known as a gunny shoe, burlap sack, hessian sack or tow sack, is a large sack, traditionally made of burlap (hessian fabric) formed from jute, hemp, sisal, or other natural fibres, usually in the crude spun form of tow. Modern-day versions of these sacks are often made from synthetic fabrics, such as polypropylene.

== Etymology ==
The word gunny derived from the Hindi word ganī, meaning "sack".

== Use ==
Reusable gunny sacks, typically holding about 50 kilograms (110 lb), were traditionally used, and continue to be to some extent, for transporting grain, potatoes and other agricultural products. In Australia, these sacks, made of Indian jute, were known traditionally as "hessian sacks", "hessian bags" or "sugar bags".

Gunny sacks are sometimes used as sandbags for erosion control, especially in emergencies. Up until the latter part of the twentieth century, when they became less common, the sacks were one of the primary tools for fighting grass fires in rural areas, used while soaked with water when available. Gunny sacks are also popular in the traditional children's game of sack racing.

== Size ==
A gunny sack in Idaho measures 45 inches (110 cm) by 34 inches (86 cm), and holds approximately 50 kg (110 lb) of potatoes. Although gunny sacks are no longer commonly used there, the common measurement unit of potatoes is still the "sack" among farmers there.

== See also ==
- Coffee bag
- Flour sack
- Jute
- Jute trade
- Natural fiber
- Sustainable packaging
