= Vacuum bag =

Vacuum bag may refer to:

- Vacuum packing of vacuum-sealed bags
- Vacuum bag moulding
- The dustbag of a Vacuum cleaner
