= Tucker bag =

Australian term for a storage bag

Tucker bag is a traditional Australian term for a storage bag used by travellers in the outback, typically a swagman or bushman, for carrying subsistence food (the term tucker being Australian and New Zealand slang for food). In its basic design a tucker bag is a pouch or bag with a single entry typically closed with a drawstring, and may have been made of leather or oilskin.

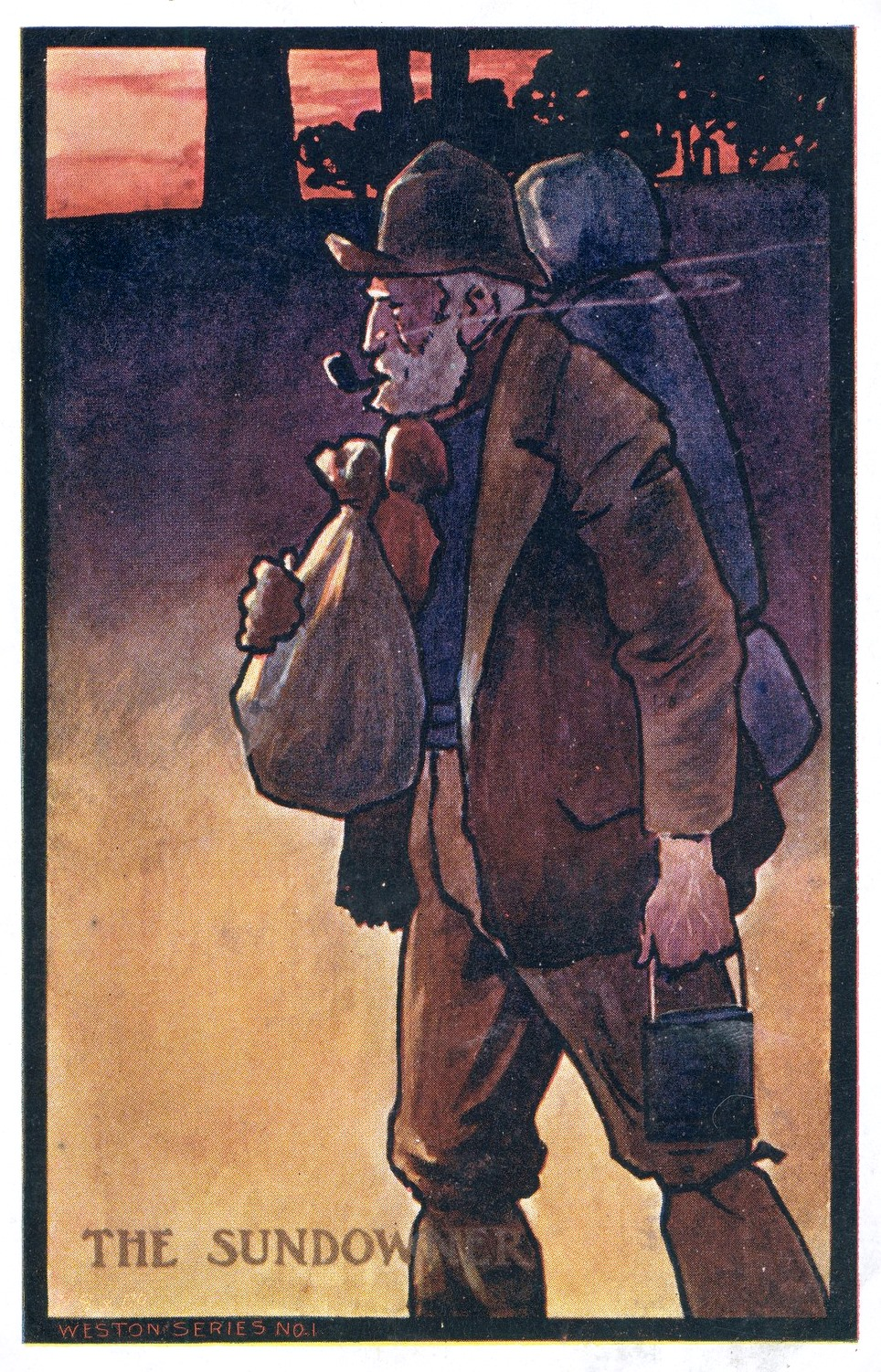
Swagman (1904 Australian postcard) "Sundowner" could be applied derogatively as meaning one who arrives at a station too late to do any useful work, but still expects a feed and top-up of the tuckerbag.

The tucker bag should not be confused with the swag, also carried by outback travellers, whether on foot, horse or pushbike, which may have comprised blankets (usually blue, hence "bluey", another name for a swag), waterproof sheet, personal effects, and basic cooking implements such as a billy. The swag would generally be carried as a sausage-shaped roll slung over the shoulder, and the tucker bag in front.

The term "tucker bag" appears in a number of traditional Australian songs and poems, including Waltzing Matilda "Whose is that jumbuck you've got in your tucker bag?", reflecting the tucker bag's place in Australian culture and history.

== Tucker box ==
Bullockies and drivers of horse-drawn vehicles were not so constrained by the need for portability, so a greater quantity of food could be carried in a tucker box, as exemplified by the story of the Dog on the Tuckerbox. The contents would be similar, though: salt beef, tea, flour and sugar or golden syrup and perhaps tinned jam.

Train crews' tucker boxes would contain more than food: a tin plate, pannikin (small pan or cup), eating utensils and toiletries. Most crews would not take meat with them but would buy it at the town where they ended their shift, since there were no refrigeration facilities on board.

"Tucker box" was a model of domestic chest freezer built in Australia under the Whirlpool brand name.

== See also ==
- Bush tucker
