= Parfleche =

Container made of rawhide

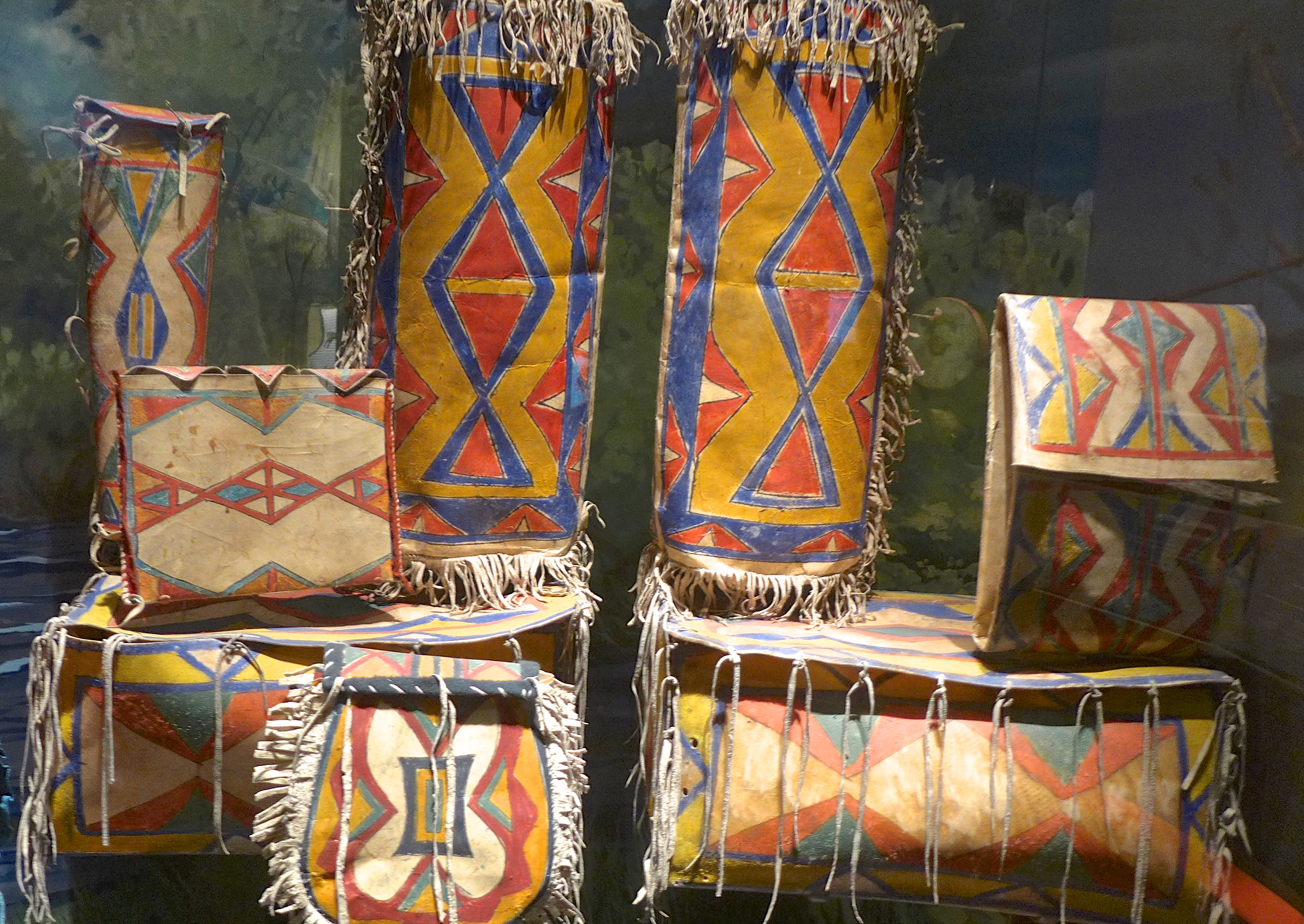
A parfleche is a type of wallet or bag made from rawhide. Historically made by Plateau, Great Basin, and Plains women, they are usually decorated with brightly colored geometrical designs.

A parfleche is a Native American rawhide container that is embellished by painting, incising, or both.

Envelope-shaped parfleches have historically been used to contain items such as household tools or foods, such as dried meat or pemmican. They were commonly made in pairs and hung from saddles. Their designs may have once served as maps. In contemporary usage, they may carry social, spiritual, and symbolic meaning, or be part of dance or parade regalia.

The bags are usually decorated with a distinctive style of graphic artwork, often symbolizing landscape features such as rivers and mountains. Historically women were the main creators of parfleches, first painting stretched-out raw hides, then shaping them into their final form. In the 21st century, both women and men make them.

The increased mobility among the post-contact Plains Indians horse culture required that essential goods such as preserved foods (including pemmican), clothing, medicines, and ceremonial items be transported efficiently in lightweight and weatherproof packaging. While the most common form of the parfleche was the folded envelope or flat wallet, they were also constructed as laced flat cases, cylinders, and trunks.

The production of parfleche bags declined drastically when commercial hunters laughtered the buffalo herds to the brink of extinction. The federal government forced Indigenous peoples to relocate onto government-partitioned reservations. While less visible to the colonists who were collecting them for museums, some tribes, particularly the Nez Perce were able to continue hunting and making parfleches throughout the 20th century. The Niisitapi and Lakota people continue to produce parfleches today.

== Etymology ==
The name "parfleche" was initially used by French fur traders in the region, and derives from the French language parer meaning "to parry" or "to defend", and flèche meaning "arrow". "Parfleche" was also used to describe tough rawhide shields, but later used primarily for these decorated rawhide containers. Different Indigenous peoples have their own names for these versatile packages, including ho'sēō'o (Cheyenne), bishkisché (Apsáalooke) and ho'úwoonó3 (Hinono'eino).

== Construction ==
Historically parfleches were almost exclusively made by women. Creation began with “fleshing”, or the removal of the hide from animals such as elk, deer, and most commonly buffalo. Craftswomen employed bone tools fashioned as chisels for fleshing. The hide was stretched by staking it above the ground, and scraped to an even thickness. A glutinous wash (prepared of prickly pear cactus juice or animal glue) was applied for protection before the moist hide was painted. Until the 1890s, natural paints were overwhelmingly used, formed using substances such as charcoal for black, algae for green, and yellow ochre for red. Because artists had a limited amount of time to paint the parfleche design, they had to work with boldness and expertise as revisions were not possible. Once the paint was dry, the craftswomen de-haired the opposite side of the hide using a “stoning” method, and cut the outline of the parfleche using a flint or metal knife. Lastly, the container was folded into its chosen shape and holes were cut or burned to insert ties and laces.

=== Craftswomen's guilds ===
Historically, the Native women with the most talent in producing parfleches, the painted designs, and similar items, have held respected positions in their communities. These women historically formed local guilds, choosing elders to oversee the preservation, practice and teaching of these skills to their proteges. The guilds can also be credited with the consistency in parfleche design across multiple nations, as they preserve and pass down the customary designs, symbolism, meanings, and techniques.

While parfleches have been stolen, collected, and admired as art pieces, their 19th-century creators (renowned in their own communities during their own times) have remained largely unknown to colonial anthropologists, collectors, and museum curators, and thus their names tend not to be known.

== See also ==
- Plains hide painting
