= Let It Be (2004 film) =

2004 Taiwanese documentary film

Let It Be 無米樂 or 无米乐 Mandarin: Wu Mi Le, Taiwanese: Bô-bí-lo̍k
- Release date: 2004
- Country: Taiwan
- Language: Taiwanese

Bô-bí-lo̍k (literally 'happiness without rice' in Taiwanese; English title: Let It Be; simplified Chinese: 无米乐; traditional Chinese: 無米樂; pinyin: Wu Mi Le) is a documentary film produced in Taiwan in 2004.

== Synopsis ==
This documentary records the lives of several old farmers (peasants) in Chheⁿ-liâu Village, Āu-piah (i.e., Houbi Township), Tainan County (now part of Tainan City). It generated discussion and debate in the Taiwanese civil society about the impact on agriculture due to its membership in the World Trade Organization.

== Reception ==
The documentary garnered a number of awards, including:

- 2004 First Prize in “Taiwan International Documentary Festival”
- 2004 “Audience’s Choice Award” in “South Taiwan Film and Video Festival”
- 2004 “Excellent Documentary Film Award” of “Golden Grain Awards”
