= Raschen bag =

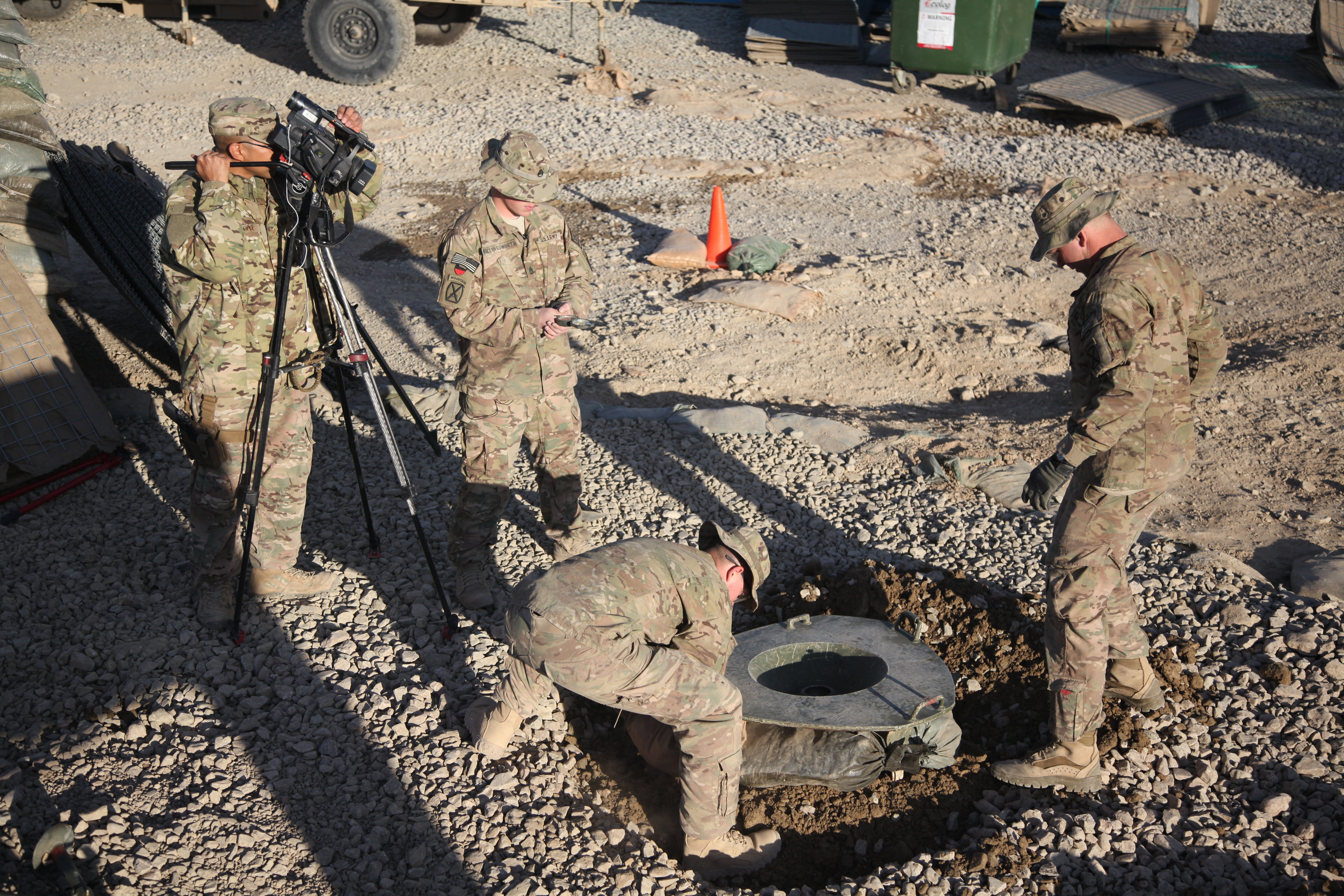
Ballast bags under a M120 mortar

A Raschen bag is a bag of ballast that is placed underneath the baseplate of a mortar to improve its accuracy when used on snow or other soft ground conditions. Raschen bags are named after Colonel Dan Raschen, Royal Engineers, who invented but did not name them.
