= Blue bag =

Bag for rubbish or recycling collections

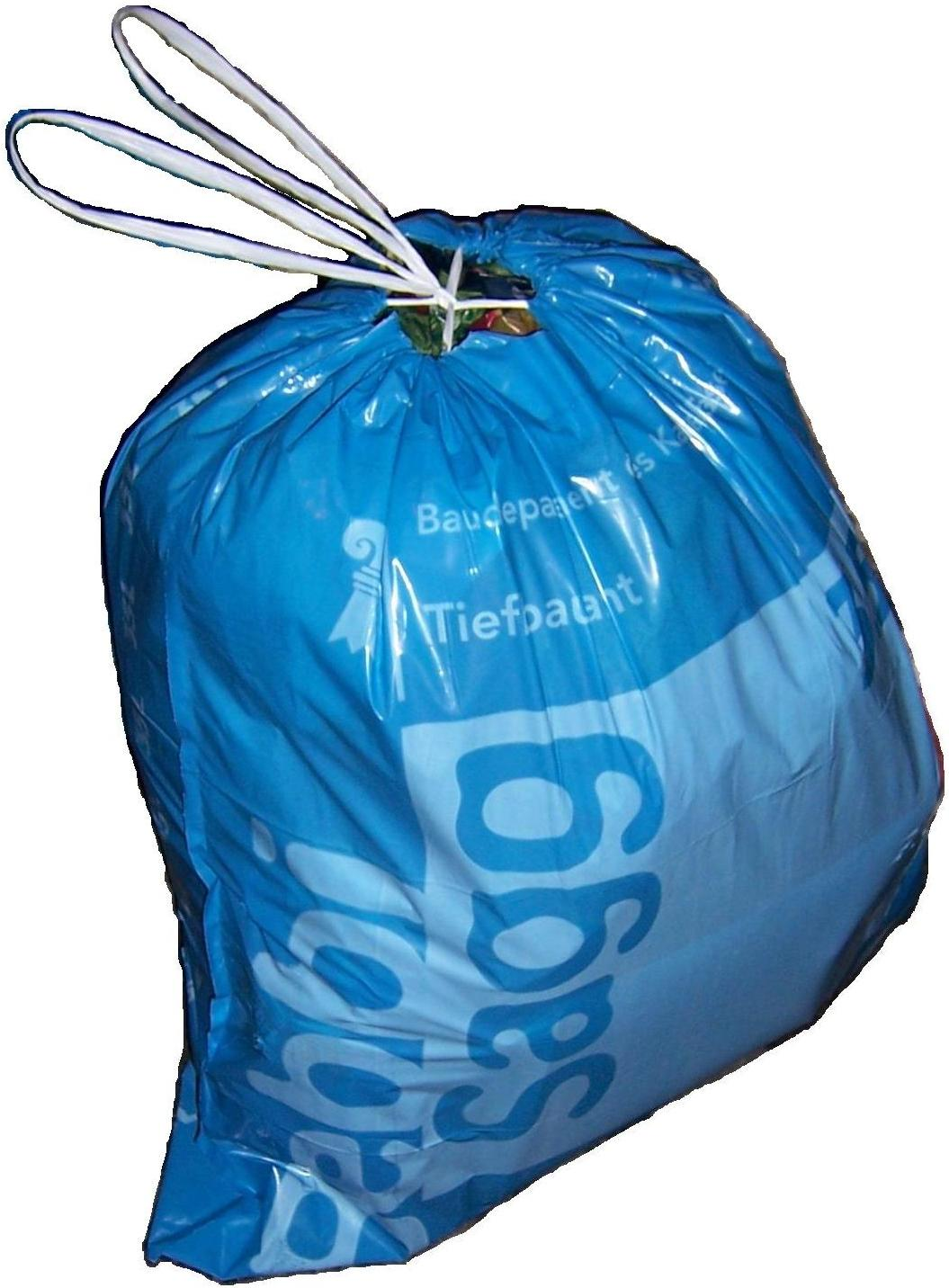
A "Bebbisagg", the official garbage bag of Basel, Switzerland

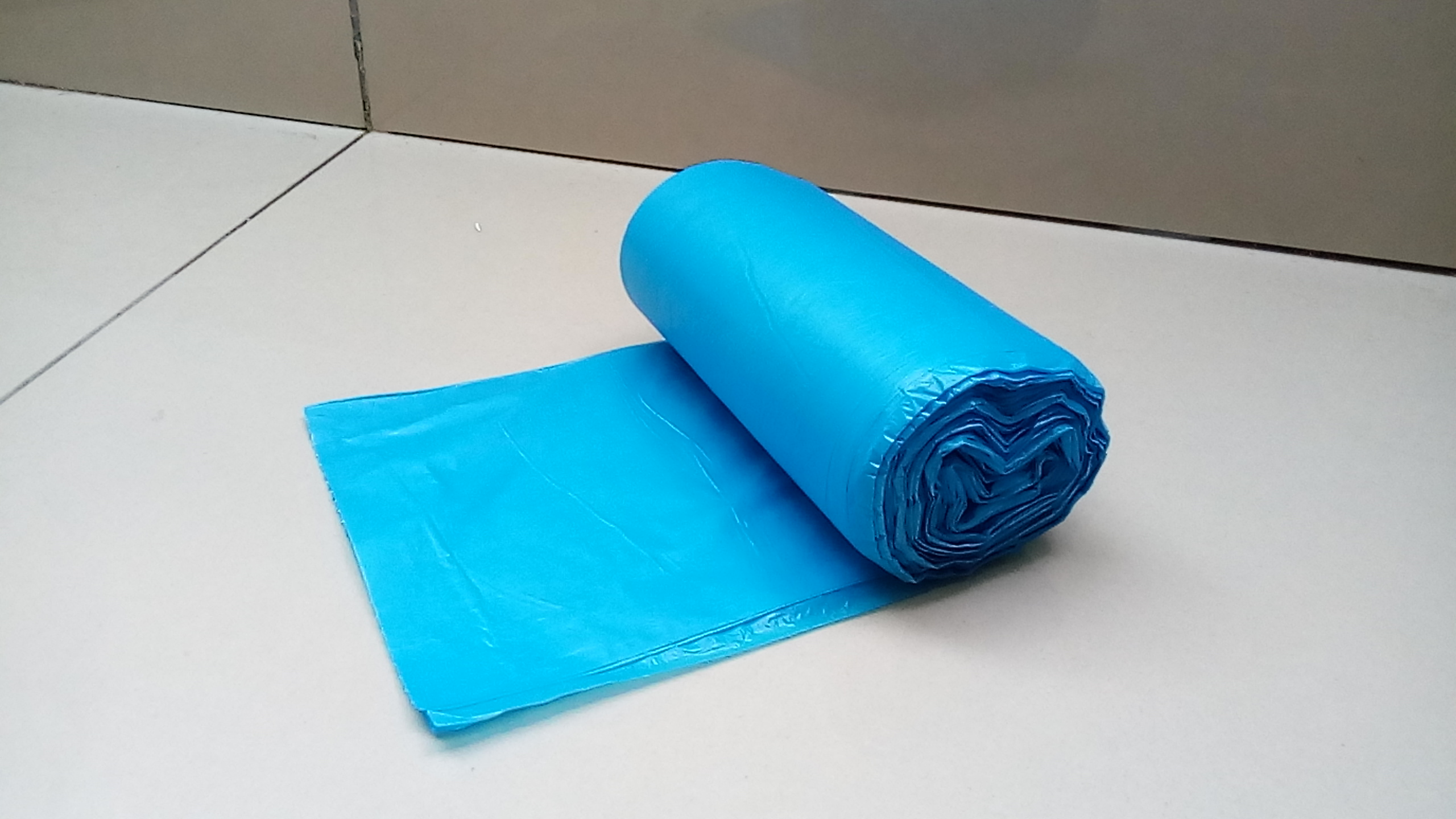
A roll of blue bags

A blue bag is a blue coloured, sometimes semi-transparent bag for waste, mandated for use in some localities for refuse or for certain specific types of refuse.

== Description ==
A blue bag is a blue coloured, sometimes semi-transparent bag for waste. In some localities, they are mandated for use for refuse or for certain specific types of refuse. In the latter usage, the distinguishing color serves to assist in recycling programs; blue typically indicates that the bag contains glass, plastic or polyethylene content.

== Location-specific ==
=== Taiwan ===
In Taipei, residents must use an official blue garbage bag to dispose of general waste, with the bags being collected from designated pickup spots.

=== United Kingdom ===
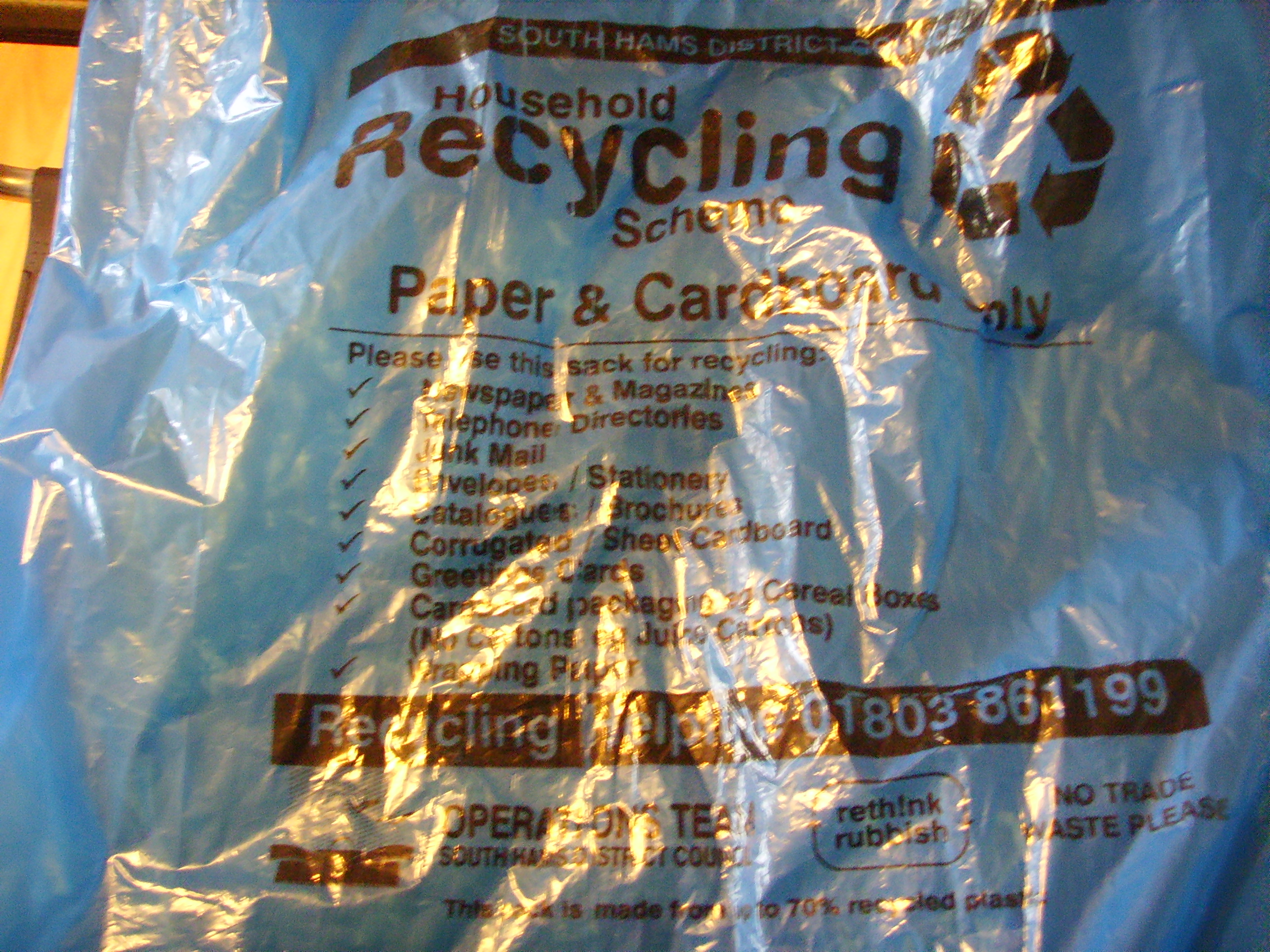
A blue bag used for recycling cardboard and paper, used by South Hams District Council, England

Blue bags are used to distinguish different types of recyclable materials at the point of collection. The content allowed differs from area to area, depending on decisions of the local council.

=== Chicago ===
The City of Chicago implemented a blue bag system in 1995. It operates by requiring willing participants to purchase blue garbage bags (available at major grocery stores throughout the city) and depositing recyclable material in the bags. The waste may be paper-based (cardboard boxes, gift boxes, newspaper, etc.), plastic and glass, or yard/lawn refuse. A separate blue bag must be used for each of the three types of recyclable material.

The Chicago system has been criticized for its tediousness and inconvenience, as blue bags cost more to the homeowner than grocery bags and this system of recycling, compared to ones implemented in other cities and suburbs, requires additional effort. Chicago Sanitation management has claimed Chicago's Blue Bag system diverts approximately 25% of its waste to recycling facilities, which was its initial goal. However, most independent studies place the estimates at approximately 9% of the garbage picked up, resulting in continued criticism towards the program.

On May 2, 2008, the Chicago SunTimes reported that Chicago is giving up on the program, planning to shift to curbside recycling in blue carts by 2011.

=== Other cities ===
Wilkes-Barre, Pennsylvania has used blue bags for garbage collection. A supplier of the city's bags expressed that the consumer cost to purchase bags incentivizes reduction in landfill waste. A change to stickers had been considered when budgeting for 2018, but the bags were retained and granted a higher purchase price. When supplies of the bags were limited in 2022, the city temporarily sold stickers to affix to normal garbage bags.

== See also ==
- Environmental protection
