= Oven bag =

Bag used for roasting food in an oven

An oven bag, cooking bag or roasting bag is a bag used for the roasting of meat or other food in an oven. An oven bag must be chosen so that it will not melt at the temperature during cooking. They may be made of heatproof nylon or sometimes with food grade polyethylene terephthalate (PET). A bag helps to keep the food being cooked moist by trapping the moisture in the bag and preventing it from escaping into the oven; as such, it serves a similar purpose to basting.

Oven bags should be carefully placed so that the bag does not come in contact with any hot surfaces in the oven, such as heating elements or oven racks. These may cause the bag to melt, smoke, or catch fire.

== Effects on health ==
In 1998, a study measured the migration of non-volatile and volatile compounds from polyamide microwave and roasting bags to chicken. As much as 16% of the total non‐volatile compounds contained in the microwave and roasting bag were observed to have migrated into the chicken after roasting at 200 °C (392 °F) for two hours, and as much as 0.08% of the total 2-cyclopentyl cyclopentanone content in the bags were observed.

A 2007 study which researched roasting bags and ready-made products in PET found that half of the products prepared at a 180 °C (356 °F) temperature exceeded the specific migration limit (SML) for antimony set for food contact material by the European Commission. The migrated amounts of antimony did not exceed the accepted tolerable daily intake (TDI) which showed that exposure from this type of food at that time did not have a toxicological concern.
