= Coffee bag =

Container used for shipping and storing coffee

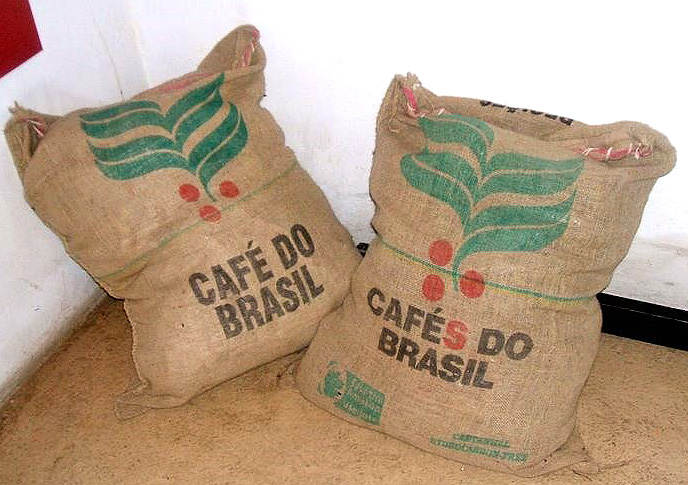
Two Brazilian jute coffee sacks

A coffee bag is a container for shipping and storing coffee. Coffee beans are usually transported in large jute sacks, while coffee sold to consumers may be packaged as beans or ground coffee in a small, sealed plastic bag.

== Bulk coffee ==
Large bulk bags, burlap bags or gunny sacks are traditionally used for storage and transport of coffee beans. Often, it is made of jute and has a content of 60 kilograms (130 pounds); this type of bag originated in Brazil and became a worldwide standard. It also became a measurement unit to this day, for example FAO's statistics on coffee production are expressed in 60-kg bags.

Jute fibers are treated with mineral oil, or historically whale oil, to improve spinnability, which raised questions about coffee contamination from these hydrocarbons, but further studies showed it to be infinitesimal. Bags with synthetic fibers (woven or non-woven) are commonly used now.

Once used, these decorative bags can be recycled or upcycled for many uses, including in clothing.

The 60 kg sack is starting to be replaced by huge polypropylene or polyethylene bags, such as the flexible intermediate bulk container. These are increasingly used for coffee exports - especially from Brazil. Intermodal shipping containers are common for international shipping.

== Consumer packaging ==
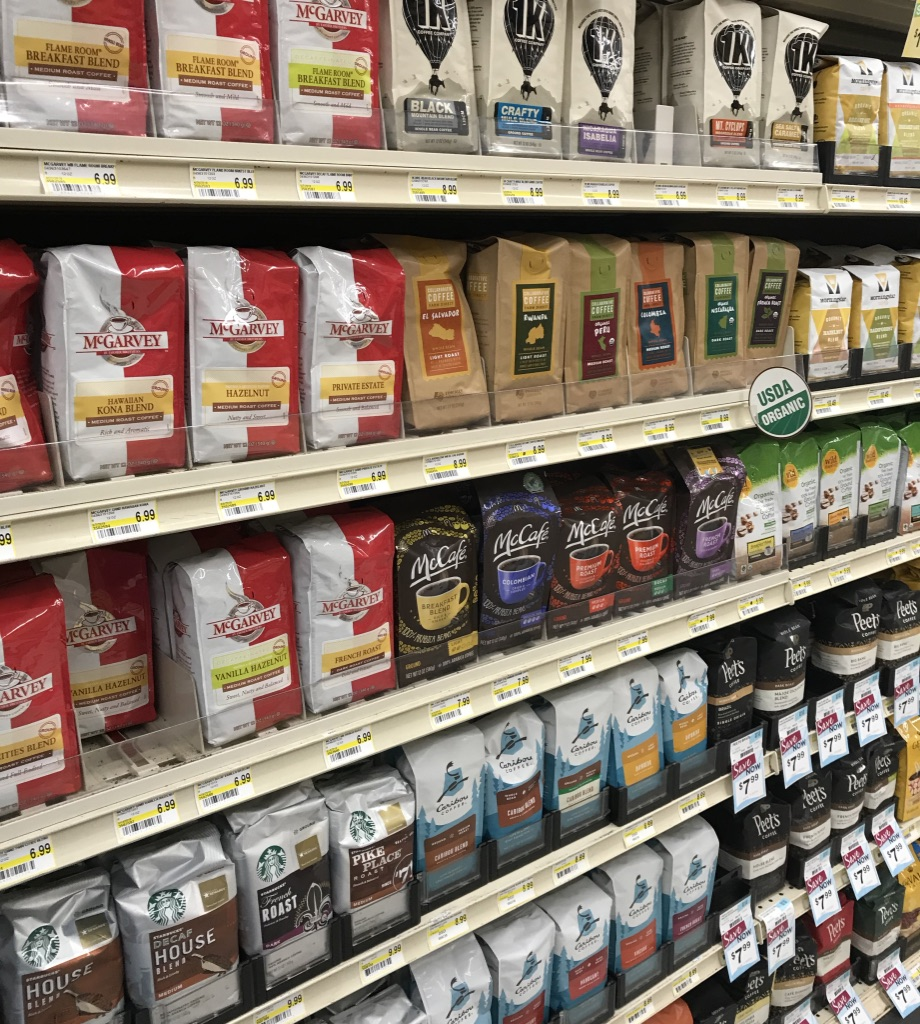
Pre-packaged bags of coffee beans and ground coffee at supermarket

Smaller bags are used by consumers for coffee beans or ground coffee. Multi-layer graphics bags have largely replaced steel cans (tins) for consumer ground coffee. There is a tendency for pressure from carbon dioxide to build up in these barrier bags. Special pressure relief valves have been developed to relieve the pressure without letting the atmosphere into the bags. Valves are either heat sealed or attached by adhesive. The bags are not readily recyclable, but compare favourably in life-cycle studies with metal cans on broader issues.

=== Examples ===
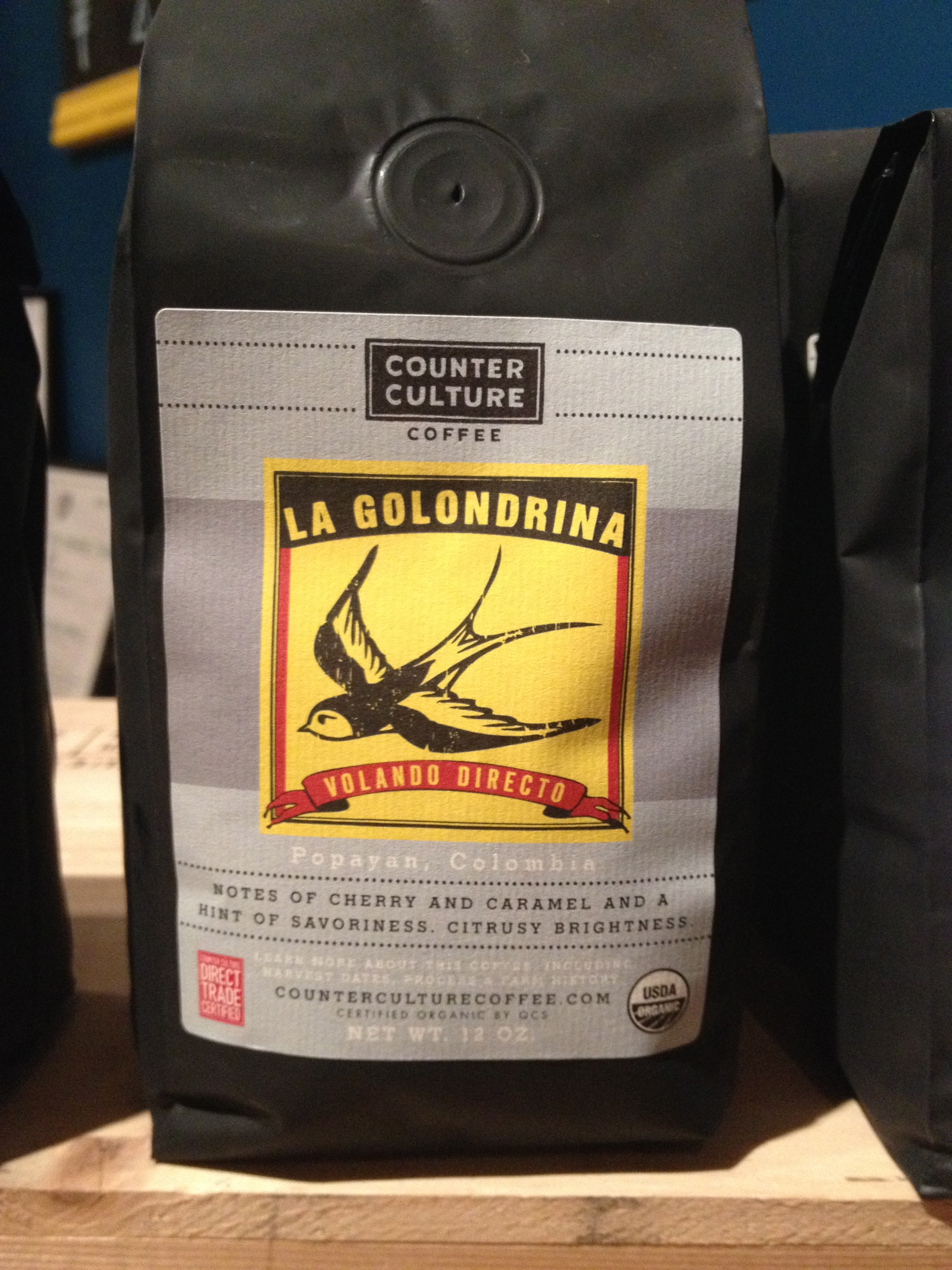
Multilayer plastic bag with a pressure-relief valve

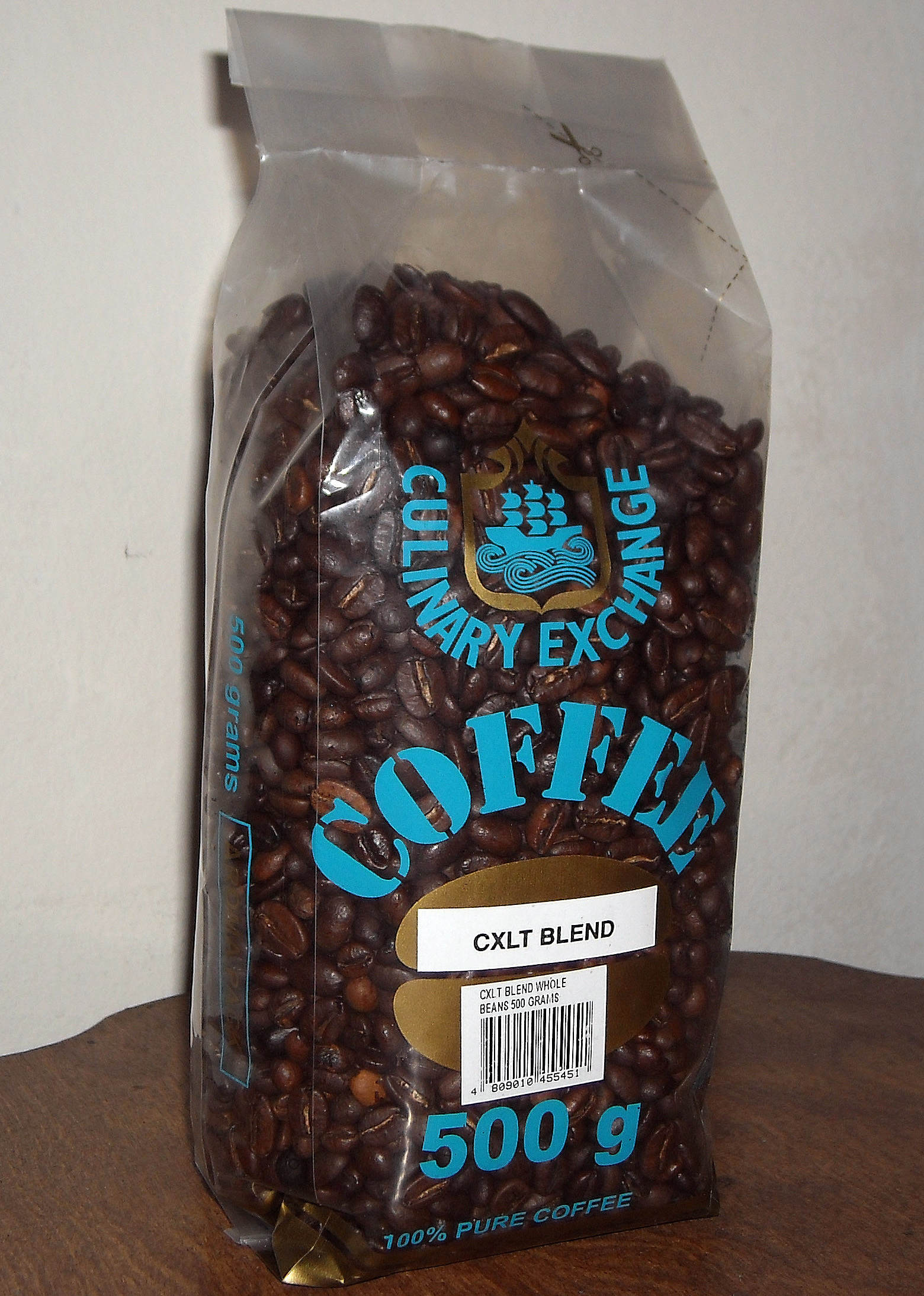
Coffee beans in a plastic bag purchased at local grocery store

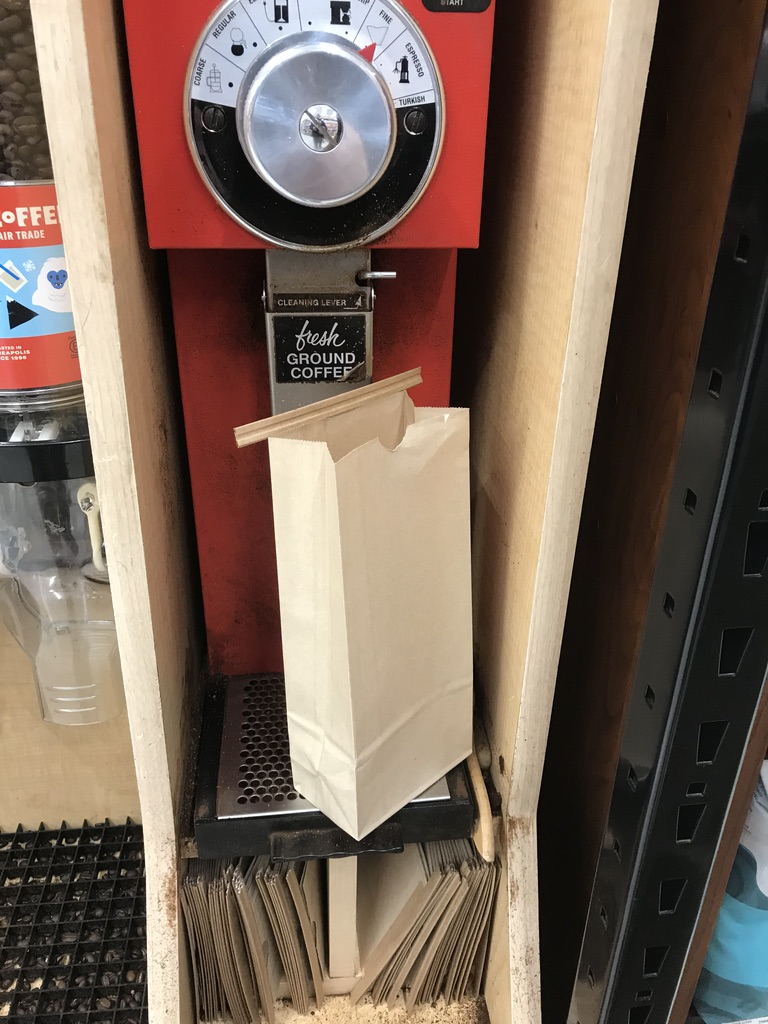
Coffee grinder at grocery store with a paper bag for ground coffee
