= Heat sealer =

Machine for joining thermoplastic materials using heat

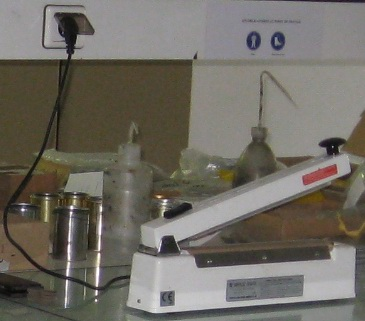
Small impulse sealer

Heat-sealed material lies on a warehouse floor. Notice the corded heat sealer to the left.

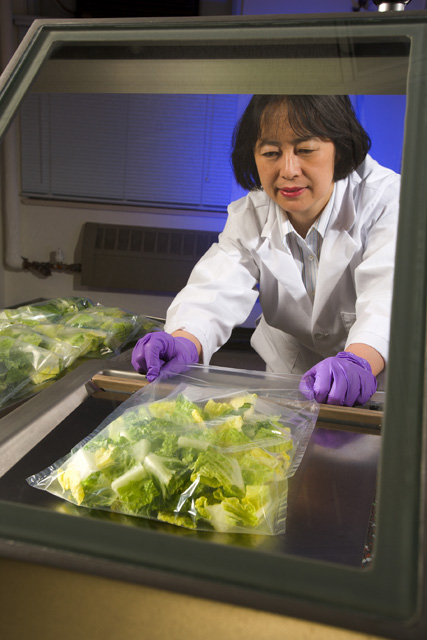
Heat sealer used to prepare plastic bag of lettuce for shelf life testing

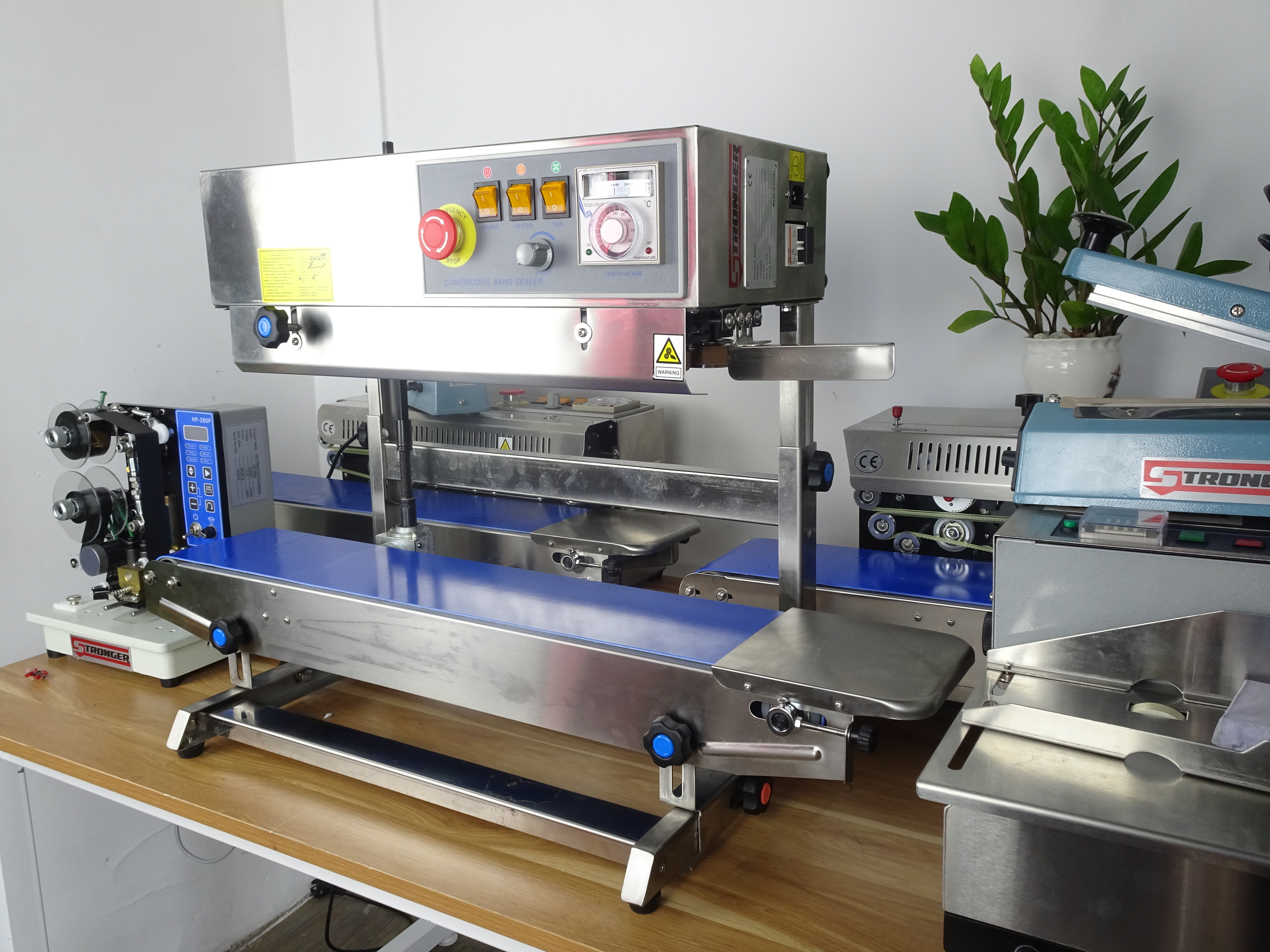
Continuous band heat sealer

A heat sealer is a machine used to seal products, packaging, and other thermoplastic materials using heat. This can be with uniform thermoplastic monolayers or with materials having several layers, at least one being thermoplastic. Heat sealing can join two similar materials together or can join dissimilar materials, one of which has a thermoplastic layer.

== Process ==
Heat sealing is the process of sealing one thermoplastic to another similar thermoplastic using heat and pressure. The direct contact method of heat sealing utilizes a constantly heated die or sealing bar to apply heat to a specific contact area or path to seal or weld the thermoplastics together. Heat sealing is used for many applications, including heat seal connectors, thermally activated adhesives, film media, plastic ports or foil sealing.

=== Applications ===
Heat seal connectors are used to join LCDs to PCBs in many consumer electronics, as well as in medical and telecommunication devices.

Heat sealing of products with thermal adhesives is used to hold clear display screens onto consumer electronic products and for other sealed thermo-plastic assemblies or devices where heat staking or ultrasonic welding are not an option due to part design requirements or other assembly considerations.

Heat sealing also is used in the manufacturing of bloodtest film and filter media for the blood, virus and many other test strip devices used in the medical field today. Laminate foils and films often are heat sealed over the top of thermoplastic medical trays, Microtiter (microwell) plates, bottles and containers to seal and/or prevent contamination for medical test devices, sample collection trays and containers used for food products.

Plastic bags and other packaging is often formed and sealed by heat sealers. Medical and fluid bags used in the medical, bioengineering and food industries. Fluid bags are made out of a multitude of varying materials such as foils, filter media, thermoplastics and laminates.

== Types of heat sealing ==
- Hot bar sealers have heated tooling kept at a constant temperature (also known as direct contact thermal sealing). They use one or more heated bars, irons, or dies which contact the material to heat the interface and form a bond. The bars, irons and dies have various configurations and can be covered with a release layer or utilize various slick interposer materials (i.e. Teflon films) to prevent sticking to the hot tooling.
- Continuous heat sealers (also known as Band type heat sealers) utilize moving belts over heating elements.
- Impulse heat sealers have heating elements (one or two) of Nichrome placed between a resilient synthetic rubber and a release surface of film or fabric. The heating elements are not continuously heated; heat is generated only when current flows. When the materials are placed in the heat sealer, they are held in place by pressure. An electric current heats the heating element for a specified time to create the required temperature. The jaws hold the material in place after the heat is stopped, sometimes with cooling water: this allows the material to fuse before stress can be applied.
- Hot melt adhesive can be applied in strips or beads at the point of joining. It can also be applied to one of the surfaces during an earlier manufacturing step and reactivated for bonding.
- Hot wire sealing involves a heated wire that both cuts the surfaces and joins them with a molten edge bead. This is not usually employed when barrier properties are critical.
- Induction sealing is a non-contact type of sealing used for inner seals in bottle caps.
- Induction welding heat sealing by non-contact induction
- Ultrasonic welding uses high-frequency ultrasonic acoustic vibrations to workpieces being held together under pressure to create a weld.

A type of heat sealer is also used to piece together plastic side panels for light-weight agricultural buildings such as greenhouses and sheds. This version is guided along the floor by four wheels.

== Seal quality ==
Good seals are a result of time, temperature and pressure for the correct clean material. Several standard test methods are available to measure the strength of heat seals. In addition, package testing is used to determine the ability of completed packages to withstand specified pressure or vacuum. Several methods are available to determine the ability of a sealed package to retain its integrity, barrier characteristics, and sterility.

Heat sealing processes can be controlled by a variety of quality management systems such as HACCP, statistical process control, ISO 9000, etc. Verification and validation protocols are used to ensure that specifications are met and final materials/packages are suited for end-use.

== Seal strength testing ==
The efficacy of heat seals is often detailed in governing specifications, contracts, and regulations. Quality management systems sometimes ask for periodic subjective evaluations: For example, some seals can be evaluated by a simple pull to determine the existence of a bond and the mechanism of failure. With some plastic films, observation can be enhanced by using polarized light which highlights the birefringence of the heat seal. Some seals for sensitive products require thorough verification and validation protocols that use quantitative testing. Test methods might include:

=== Seal strength per ASTM F88 and F2824 ===
Seal strength testing, also known as peel testing, measures the strength of seals within flexible barrier materials. This measurement can then be used to determine consistency within the seal, as well as evaluation of the opening force of the package system. Seal strength is a quantitative measure for use in process validation, process control and capability. Seal strength is not only relevant to opening force and package integrity, but to measuring the packaging processes’ ability to produce consistent seals.

=== Burst and Creep per ASTM F1140 and F2054 ===
The burst test is used to determine the packages strength and precession. The burst test is performed by pressurizing the package until it bursts. The results for the burst test include the burst pressure data and a description of where the seal failure occurred. This test method covers the burst test as defined in ASTM F1140. The Creep test determines the packages ability to hold pressure for an extended period. The creep test is performed by setting the pressure at about 80% of the minimum burst pressure of a previous burst test. The time to seal failure or a pre-set time is measured.

=== Vacuum Dye per ASTM D3078 ===
Determination of package integrity. The package is submerged in a transparent container filled with a mixture of water and dye. Vacuum is created inside the container and maintained for a specific length of time. When the vacuum is released, any punctured packages will draw in dye revealing the imperfect seal.

== See also ==
- Shrink tunnel
- Shrink wrap
- Hermetic seal
- Plastic bag
- Plastic welding
- Tensile testing
- Waxtite
