= Waxed paper =

Treated type of paper

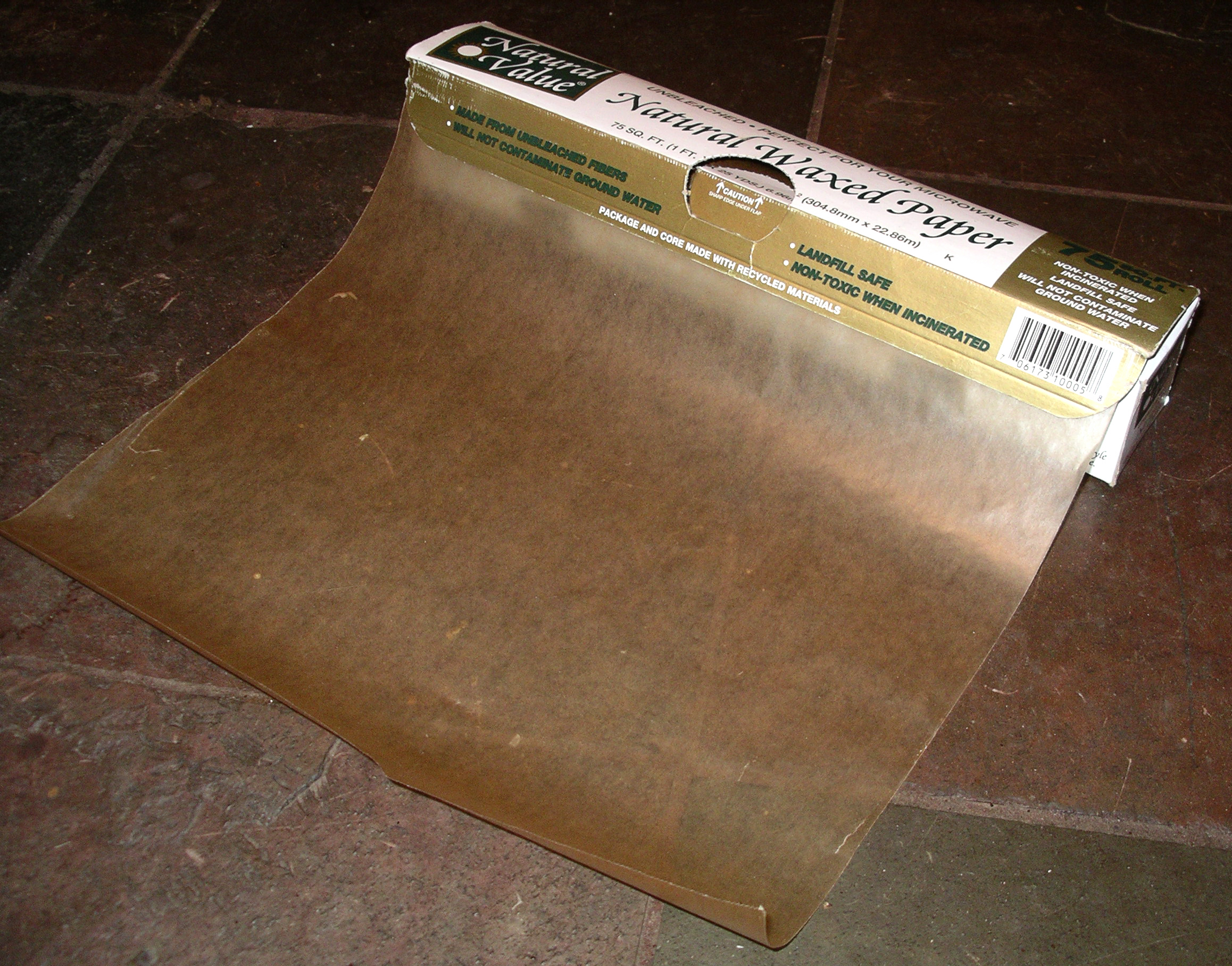
Waxed paper

Waxed paper (also wax paper, waxpaper, or paraffin paper) is paper that has been made moisture-proof and grease-proof through the application of wax.

The practice of oiling parchment or paper in order to make it semi-translucent or moisture-proof goes back at least to the Middle Ages. Paper impregnated or coated with purified beeswax was widely used throughout the 19th century to retain or exclude moisture, or to wrap odorous products. Gustave Le Gray introduced the use of waxed paper for photographic negatives in 1851. Natural wax was largely replaced for the making of waxed paper (or paraffine paper) after Herman Frasch developed ways of purifying paraffin and coating paper with it in 1876. Waxed paper is commonly used in cooking for its non-stick properties, and wrapping food for storage, such as cookies, as it keeps water out or in. It is also used in arts and crafts.

== Food preparation ==
Waxed paper is not recommended for baking use in an oven, as it will smoke. Parchment paper is better for this use.

In a microwave, waxed paper can be used to prevent splatters by covering the food when microwave cooking. Since the paper is mostly unaffected by microwaves, it will not heat to the point of combustion under normal usage. This makes waxed paper more functional than plastic wrap which will melt at higher temperatures, or aluminium foil, which is not safe for use in most microwave ovens.

== Other uses ==
Safety razor blades are traditionally wrapped in waxed paper to make handling them less dangerous.

From the early 1950s to the mid-1990s, waxed paper was used as a common wrapping for sports card packages (O-Pee-Chee, Topps, Donruss, etc.). It was notorious for leaving wax markings on the back card where the waxed paper was heated to be sealed. Waxed paper was used as a way to keep the enclosed piece of bubble gum protected. In the mid-1990s, sports card manufacturers stopped including pieces of bubble gum in packs of sports cards, thus ending the need for waxed paper packs. Plastic (often, mylar) or other plastic/paper blends were used from then on.

A version of the paper, trademarked Waxtite, was used to protect early packages of Kellogg's cereal.

Waxed paper is also commonly used to attach pattern pieces to fabric while cutting it for sewing. One presses an iron over the waxed paper briefly and attaches it to the cloth, making it easier to trace while cutting.

Waxed paper's particularly high dielectric strength makes it a practical electrical insulator, although modern materials have surpassed and mostly replaced it. Common applications are coil winding separators and capacitor dielectrics, and other applications requiring resilience against a potential difference up to the order of a few thousand volts per layer.

In photography, waxed paper can be used as a light diffuser. Making waxed paper roses was a hobby among Sri Lankan women.

== Environmental issues ==
Most commercial wax paper uses petroleum-derived paraffin or synthetic additives. [citation needed] Such coatings are neither compostable nor recyclable through paper streams. Paper coated with beeswax or another organic wax is compostable, though it still cannot be recycled as paper.

== See also ==
- Aluminium foil — Tin foil
- Greaseproof paper
- Glassine
- Parchment
- Parchment paper (baking)
- Plastic wrap
