= Sandwich wrap =

Sandwich wrap may refer to:

- Plastic wrap or wax paper used to wrap sandwiches.
- Wrap (food), a type of sandwich made by rolling flatbread around a filling.
