= Plastic bag =

Type of packaging

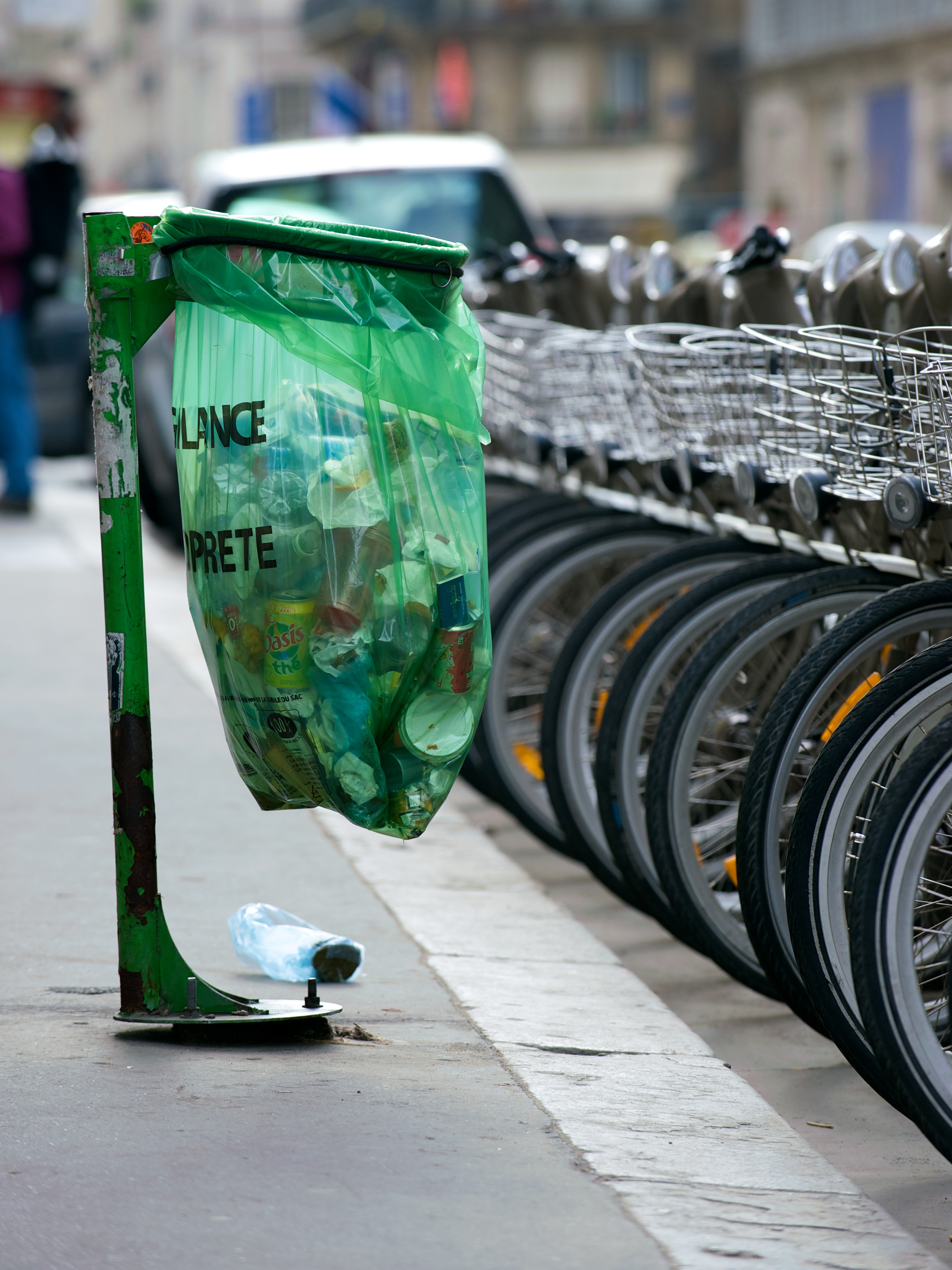
- A plastic bag used to collect waste on a street in Paris, 2010
- Classification: Bag
- Uses: Container
- Inventor: Sten Gustaf Thulin

A plastic bag, poly bag, or pouch is a type of container made of thin, flexible, plastic film, nonwoven fabric, or plastic textile. Plastic bags are used for containing and transporting goods such as foods, produce, powders, ice, magazines, chemicals, and waste. It is a common form of packaging.

In the late 1950s, Curt Lindquist, the CEO of the Celloplast company in Sweden, experimented with a new and promising material: plastic. By cutting and heat-sealing pieces together, he invented the first seamless plastic bag. The patent was awarded in 1965. Today most plastic bags are heat sealed at the seams, while some are bonded with adhesives or are stitched.

Many countries are introducing legislation to phase out lightweight plastic bags, because plastic never fully breaks down, causing everlasting pollution of plastics and environmental impacts. Every year, about 1 to 5 trillion plastic bags are used and discarded around the world. From point of sale to destination, plastic bags have a lifetime of 12 minutes. Approximately 320 bags per capita were used in 2014 in the United States.

== Package ==
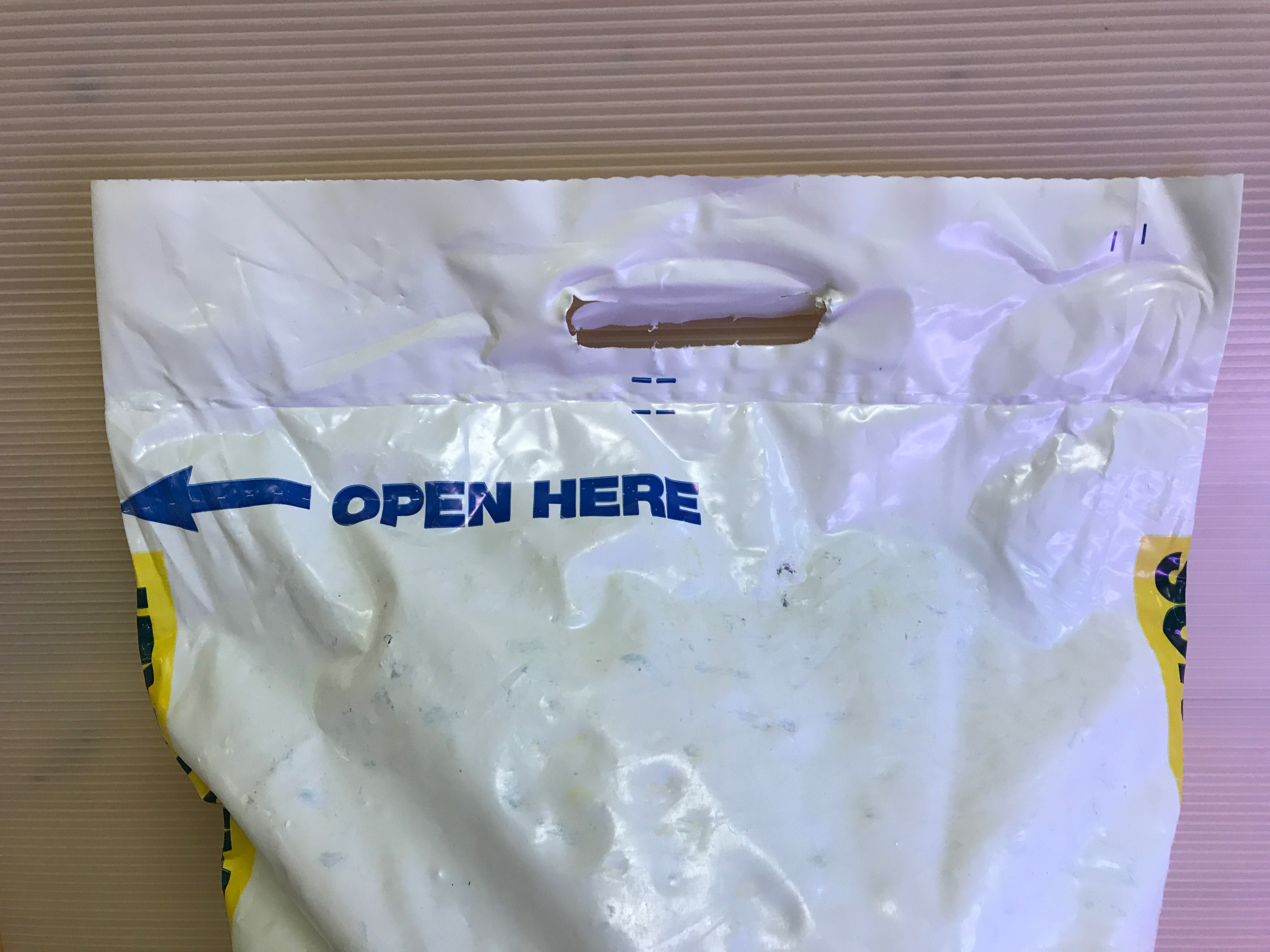
Plastic bag of water softener salt. A handle is die-cut through the thick plastic to allow carrying.

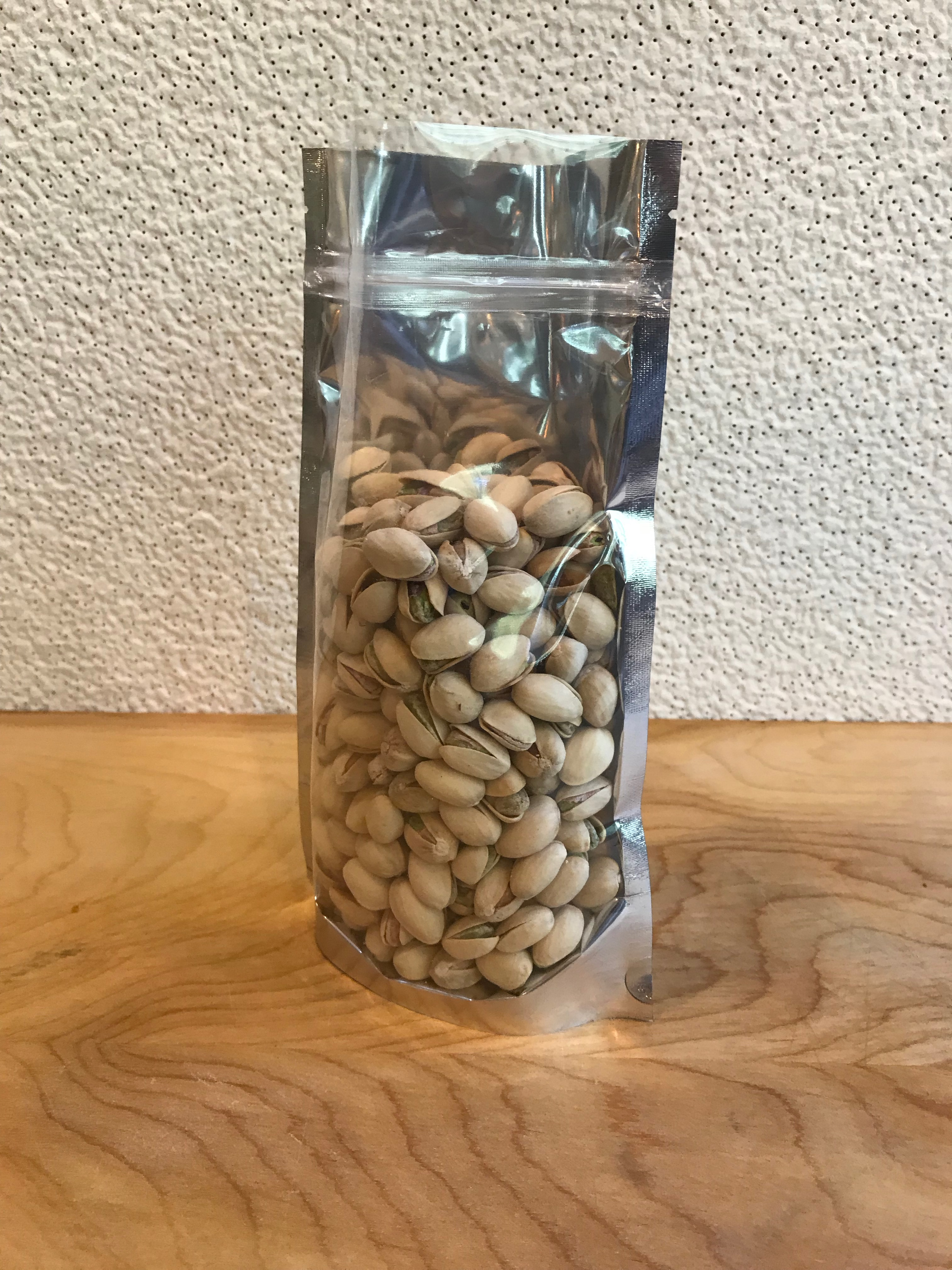
Stand-up pouch containing nuts

Several design options and features are available. Some bags have gussets to allow a higher volume of contents, special stand-up pouches have the ability to stand up on a shelf or a refrigerator, and some have easy-opening or reclosable options. Handles are cut into or added into some.

Bags can be made with a variety of plastics films. Polyethylene (LDPE, LLDPE, etc.) is the most common. Other forms, including laminates and co-extrusions can be used when the physical properties are needed. Plastics to create single use bags are primarily made with fossil fuels. International Plastic Bag Free Day is celebrated on July 3.

Plastic bags usually use less material than comparable to boxes, cartons, or jars, thus are often considered as "reduced or minimized packaging". In June 2009 Germany's Institute for Energy and Environmental Research concluded that oil-based plastics, especially if recycled, have a better life-cycle analysis than compostable plastics. They added that "The current bags made from bioplastics have less favourable environmental impact profiles than the other materials examined" and that this is due to the process of raw-material production.

Depending on the construction, plastic bags can be suited for plastic recycling. They can be incinerated in appropriate facilities for waste-to-energy conversion. They are stable and benign in sanitary landfills. If disposed of improperly, however, plastic bags can create litter and harm some types of wildlife. Plastic bags have low recycling rates due to lack of separation ability. Mixed material recycling causes contamination of the material. However, plastic bags are reused before discard at a rate of 1.6 times.

Bags come with various features such as carrying handles, hanging holes, tape attachments, and security features. Some bags are designed for easy opening and have reclosable press-to-seal zipper strips. This feature is commonly found in empty kitchen bags and some food packaging. Some bags are sealed for tamper-evident capability, including some where the press-to-reseal feature becomes accessible only when a perforated outer seal has torn away.

Boil-in-bags are often used for sealed frozen foods, sometimes complete entrees. The bags are usually tough heat-sealed nylon or polyester to withstand the temperatures of boiling water. Some bags are porous or perforated to allow the hot water to contact the food: rice, noodles, etc. Grocery stores are the single largest supplier of single-use plastic bags.

Bag-in-box packaging is often used for liquids such as box wine and institutional sizes of other liquids.

== Medical uses ==
Plastic bags are used for many medical purposes. The non-porous quality of plastic film means that they are useful for isolating infectious body fluids; other porous bags made of nonwoven plastics can be sterilized by gas and maintain this sterility. Bags can be made under regulated sterile manufacturing conditions, so they can be used when the infection is a health risk. They are lightweight and flexible, so they can be carried by or laid next to patients without making the patient as uncomfortable as a heavy glass bottle would be. They are less expensive than re-usable options, such as glass bottles. Moderate quality evidence from a 2018 systematic review showed that plastic wraps or bags prevented hypothermia compared to routine care, especially in extremely preterm infants.

== Flexible intermediate bulk container ==
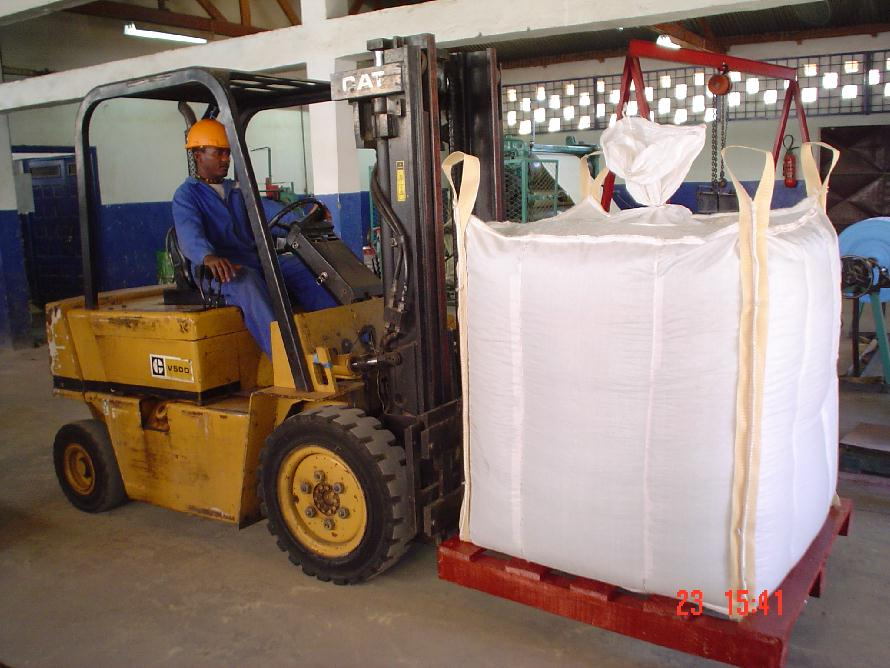
FIBC; Bulk bag. Flexible intermediate bulk container

Flexible intermediate bulk containers are large industrial containers, usually used for bulk powders or flowables. They are usually constructed of woven heavy-duty plastic fibers. It is a large, industrial-grade bag designed for the storage and transportation of dry, flowable materials in bulk quantities. Commonly known as bulk bags, jumbo bags, ton bags, or super sacks, these containers represent the most efficient, cost-effective solution for handling materials weighing between 500 kg and 2,000 kg.

== Plastic shopping bags ==
Open bags with carrying handles are used in large numbers. Stores often provide them as a convenience to shoppers. Some stores charge a nominal fee for a bag. Heavy-duty reusable shopping bags are often considered environmentally better than single-use paper or plastic shopping bags. Because of environmental and litter problems, some locations are working toward a phase-out of lightweight plastic bags.

=== History ===
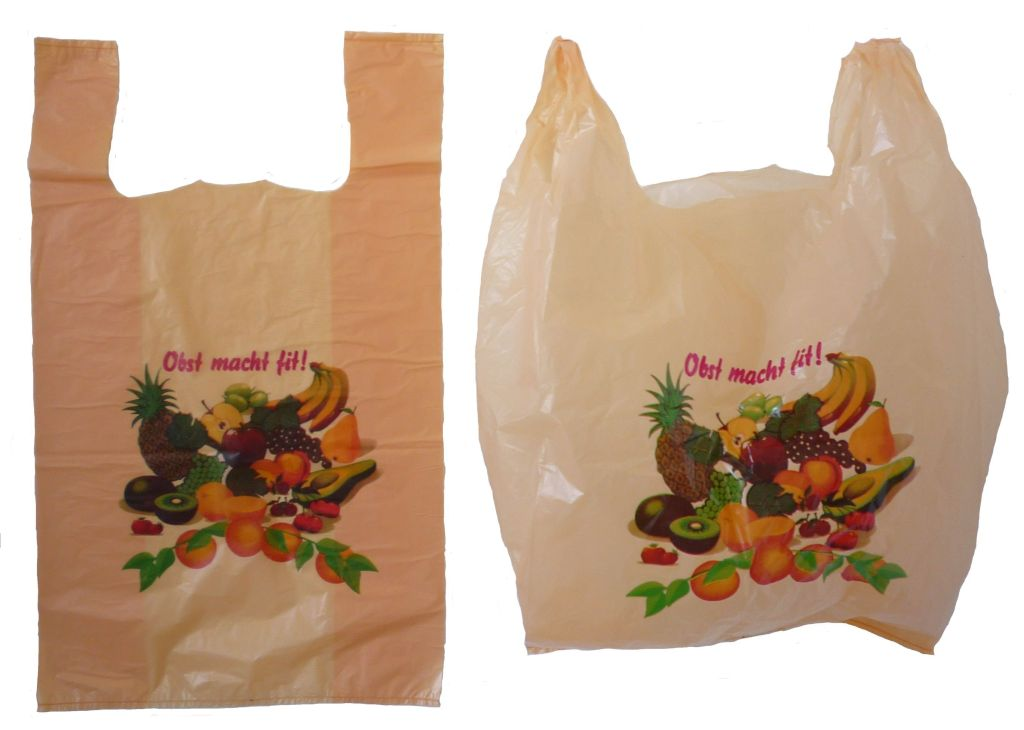
A German plastic shopping bag, freshly folded (left) and used (right)

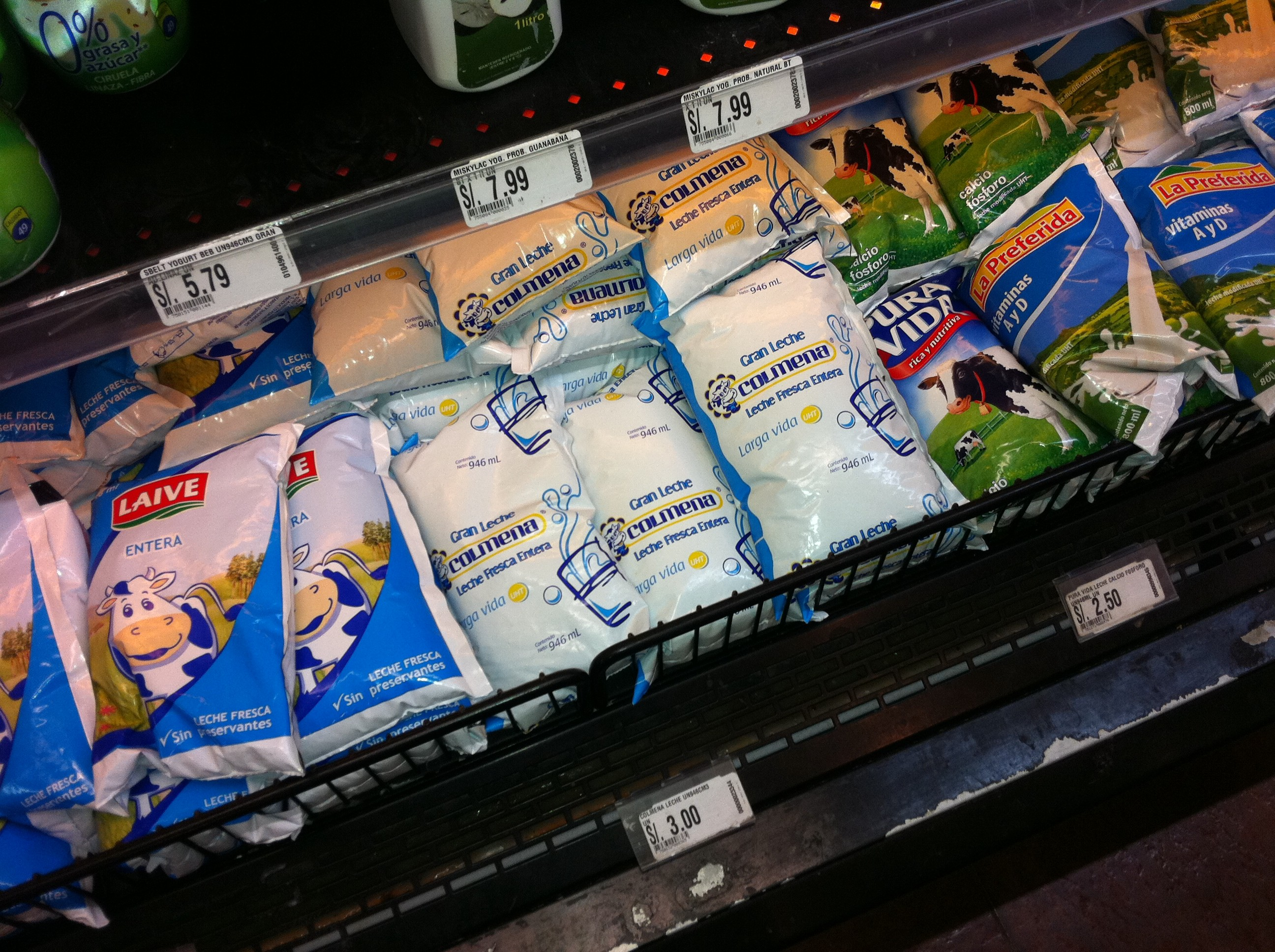
Milk bags

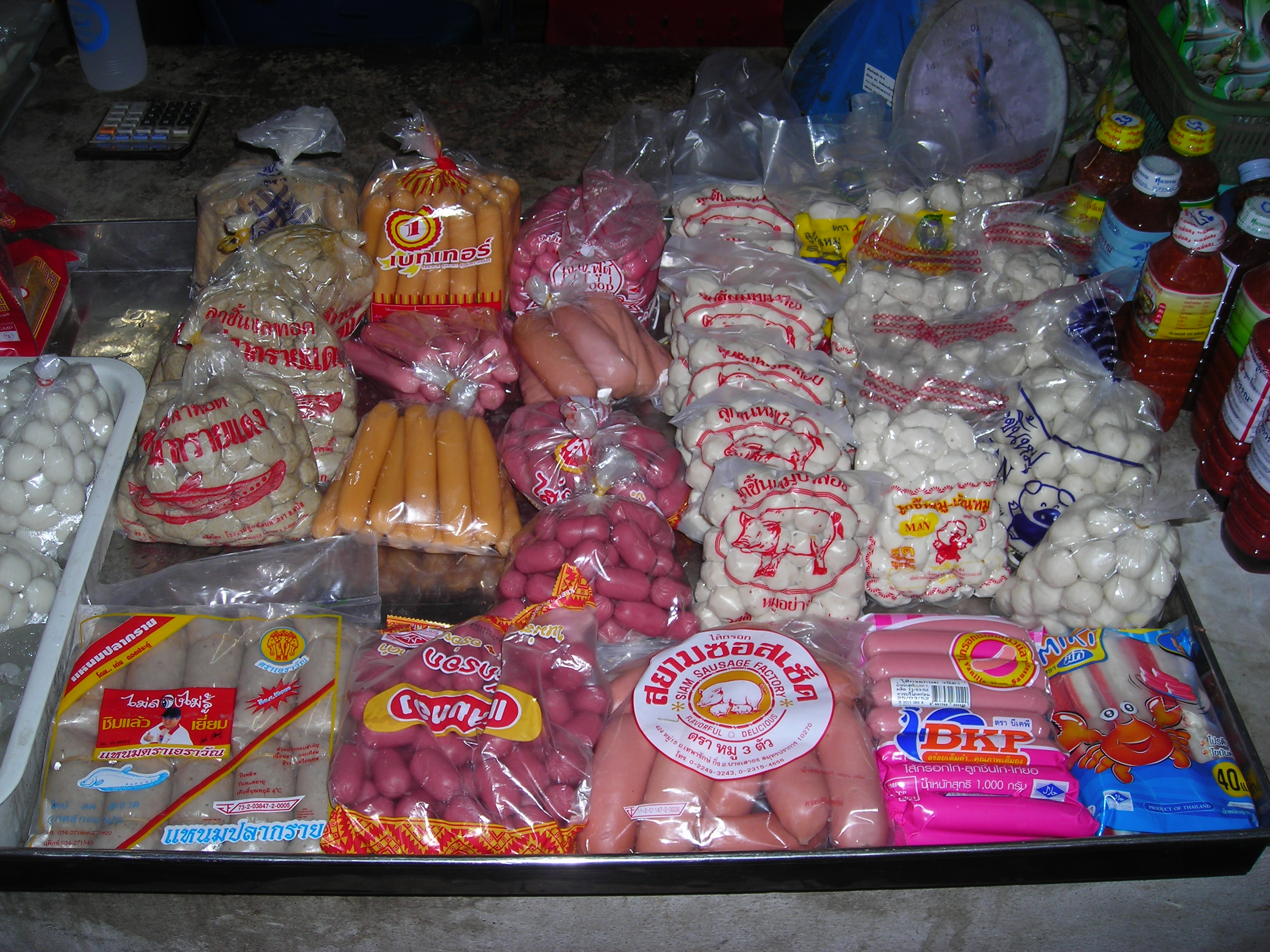
Different meat products of Thailand in plastic bags

American and European patent applications relating to the production of plastic shopping bags can be found dating back to the early 1950s, but these refer to composite constructions with handles fixed to the bag in a secondary manufacturing process. The modern lightweight shopping bag is the invention of Swedish engineer Sten Gustaf Thulin. In the early 1960s, Thulin developed a method of forming a simple one-piece bag by folding, welding and die-cutting a flat tube of plastic for the packaging company Celloplast of Norrköping, Sweden. Thulin's design produced a simple, strong bag with a high load-carrying capacity, and was patented worldwide by Celloplast in 1965.

From the mid-1980s onwards, plastic bags became common for carrying daily groceries from the store to vehicles and homes throughout the developed world. As plastic bags increasingly replaced paper bags, and as other plastic materials and products replaced glass, metal, stone, timber and other materials, a packaging materials war erupted, with plastic shopping bags at the center of highly publicized disputes.

In 1992, Sonoco Products Company of Hartsville, South Carolina, patented the "self-opening polyethylene bag stack". The main innovation of this redesign is that the removal of a bag from the rack opens the next bag in the stack.

=== International usage ===
The number of plastic bags used and discarded worldwide has been estimated to be on the order of one trillion annually. The use of plastic bags differs dramatically across countries. While the average consumer in China uses only two or three plastic bags a year, the numbers are much higher in most other countries: Denmark: four; Ireland: 20; Germany: 65; Poland, Hungary, Slovakia: more than 400.

=== Bans ===
A large number of cities and counties have banned the use of plastic bags by grocery stores or introduced a minimum charge. In September 2014, California became the first US state to pass a law banning their use, but the ban contained what has since been called a loophole, allowing supermarkets to provide thicker plastic bags as "reusable" bags at a cost of 10 cents each. In 2024, California passed a new law, taking effect in 2026, which closes this loophole and reinforces the original ban. In India, the government has banned the use of plastic bags of a thickness below 50 microns. In 2018, Montreal, Canada, also banned plastic bags with Ottawa expected to also put the ban into effect.

=== Plastic bags and the environment ===
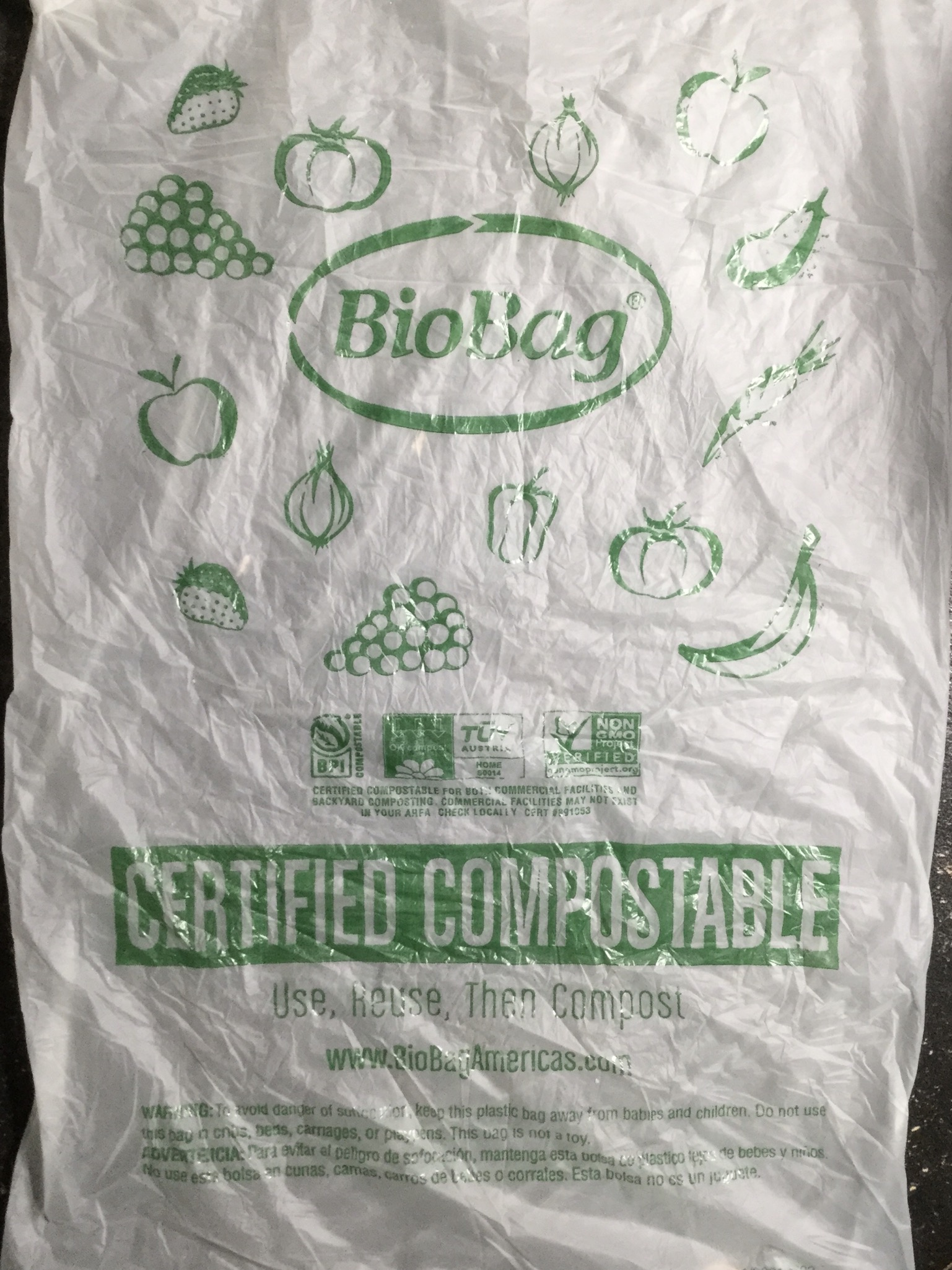
Compostable bag from a grocery store in Tulsa, Oklahoma

Plastic bags are primarily made out of petroleum products and natural gas. 8% of the world's petroleum resources are used for creating plastic bags at 12 million barrels of oil a day. Half of that is used as materials to make them, and the other half for energy to make them. One concern about this manufacturing process is the air pollution it causes.

Non-compostable plastic bags can take up to 1000 years to decompose. Plastic bags are not capable of biodegradation but rather they photodegrade, a process by which the plastic bags are broken down into smaller toxic parts. In the 2000s, many stores and companies began to use different types of biodegradable bags to comply with perceived environmental benefits.

When plastic shopping bags are not disposed of properly, they can end up in streams, which then lead them to end up in the open ocean. To mitigate marine plastic pollution and plastic pollution in general from single-use shopping bags, many jurisdictions around the world have implemented bans or fees on the use of plastic bags. An estimated 300 million plastic bags end up in the Atlantic Ocean alone. The way in which the bags float in open water can resemble a jellyfish, posing significant dangers to marine mammals and leatherback sea turtles, when they are eaten by mistake and enter the animals' digestive tracts. After ingestion, the plastic material can lead to premature death. Once death occurs and the animal body decomposes, the plastic reenters the environment, posing more potential problems.

Huge masses of plastic waste are arriving in the oceans per annum and causing several damages which include risk of marine species, disturbance in food web ultimately effecting marine ecosystem, several microbial and alien species colonize on plastic particles enhancing their harmfulness, and plastic particles driven by winds form garbage patches in various parts of the oceans.

Marine animals are not the only animals affected by improper plastic bag disposal. Sea birds, when hunting, sense for dimethyl sulfide (DMS) which is produced by algae. Plastic is a breeding ground for algae, so the sea birds mistakenly eat the bag rather than the fish that typically ingests algae. (National Geographic)

Plastic bags do not do well in the environment, but several government studies have found them to be an environmentally friendly carryout bag option. According to the Recyc-Quebec, a Canadian recycling agency, "The conventional plastic bag has several environmental and economic advantages. Thin and light, its production requires little material and energy. It also avoids the production and purchase of garbage/bin liner bags since it benefits from a high reuse rate when reused for this purpose (77.7%)." Government studies from Denmark and the United Kingdom, as well as a study from Clemson University, came to similar conclusions.

Even though the bags are plastic, they typically cannot be recycled in curbside recycling bins. The material frequently causes the equipment used at recycling plants to jam, thus having to pause the recycle machinery and slow down daily operations. However, plastic bags are 100% recyclable. To recycle them the user needs to drop them off at a location that accepts plastic film. Usually, this means taking them back to the grocery store or another major retail store.

== Danger to children ==
Thin, conformable plastic bags, especially dry cleaning bags, have the potential to cause suffocation. Because of this, about 25 children in the United States suffocate each year due to plastic bags, almost nine-tenths of whom are under the age of one. This has led to voluntary warning labels on some bags posing a hazard to small children.

== Uses ==
Plastic bags are used for diverse applications:

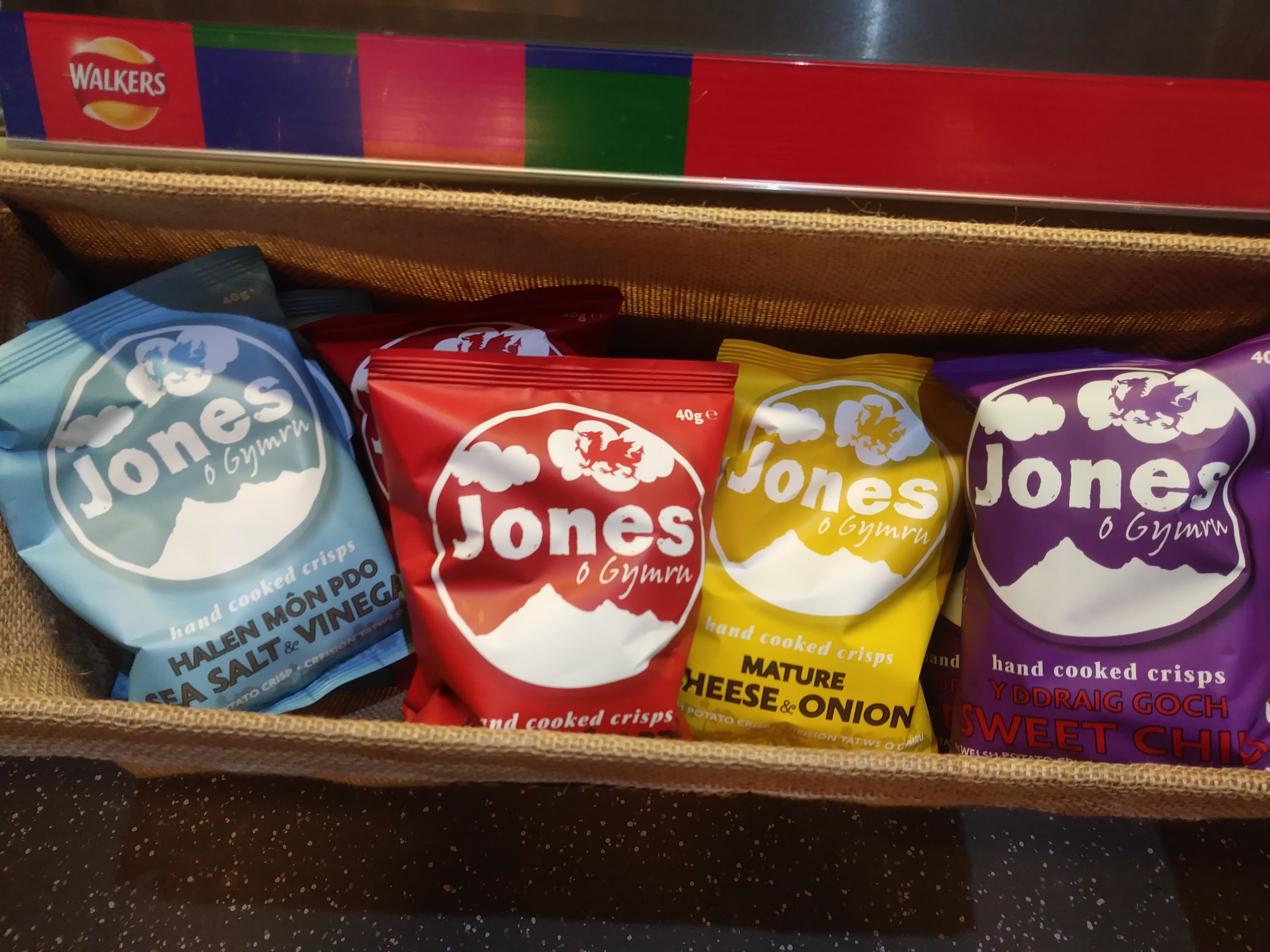
Bags of crisps (chips)

Gardening supplies

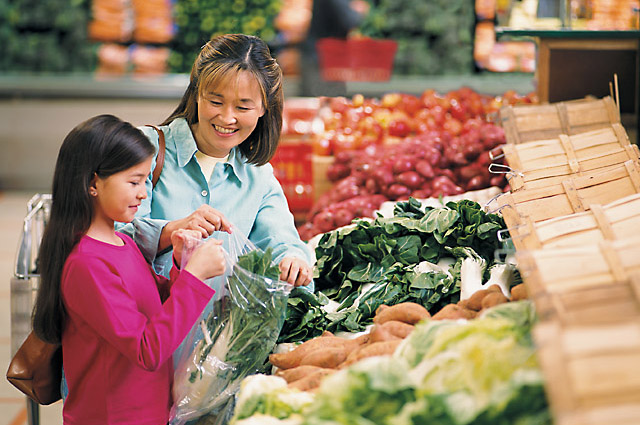
Bagging vegetables

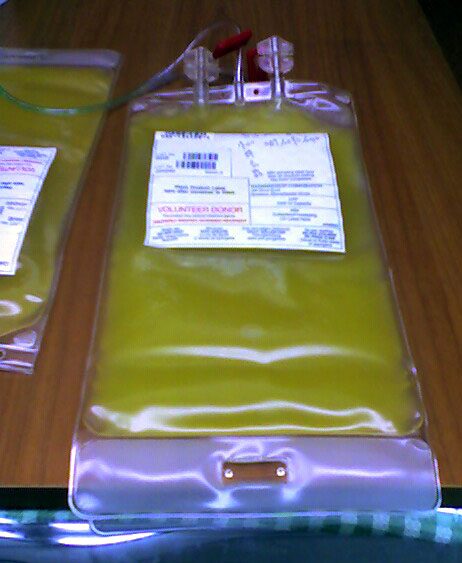
blood platelets

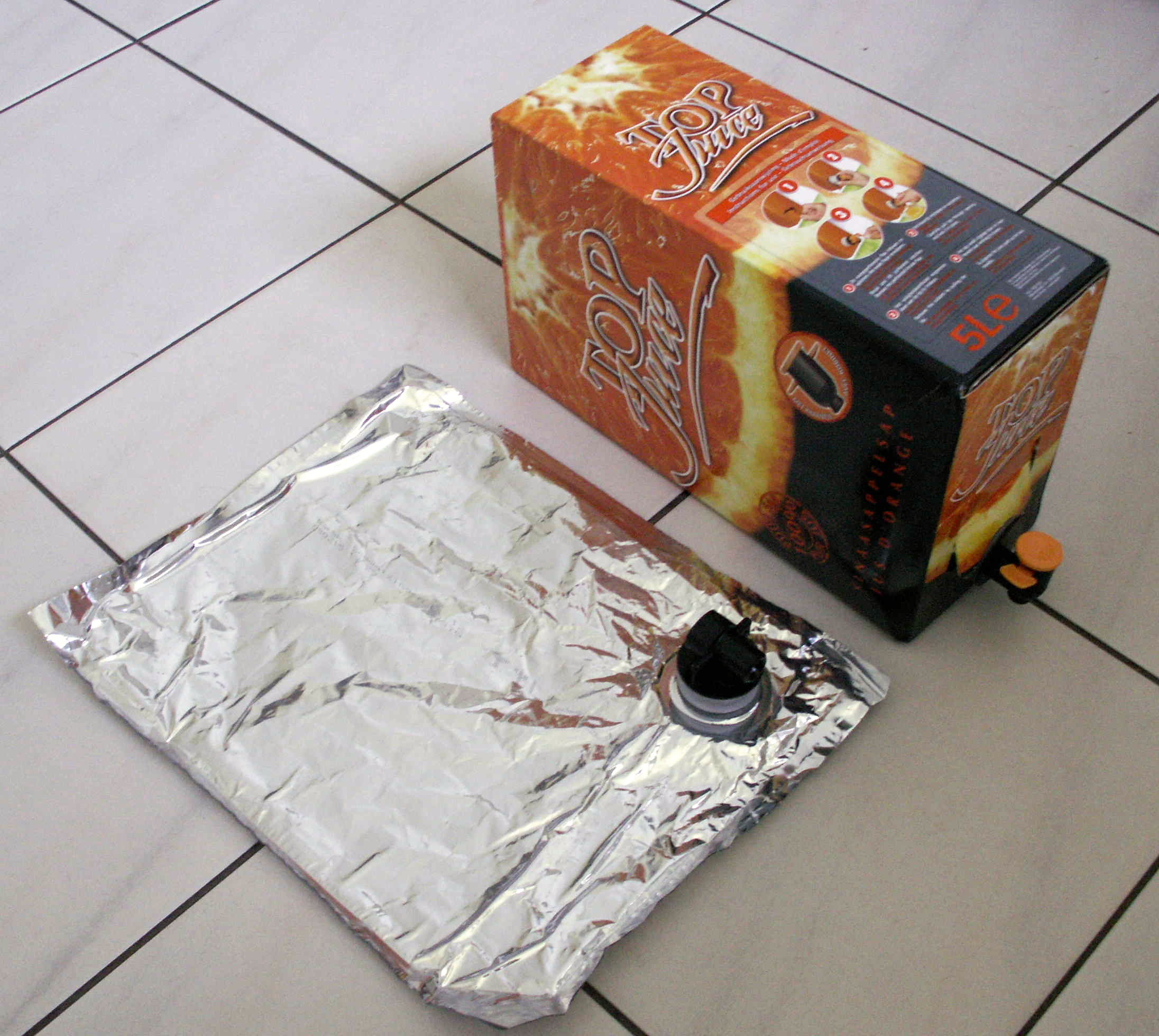
inner bladder for bag-in-box

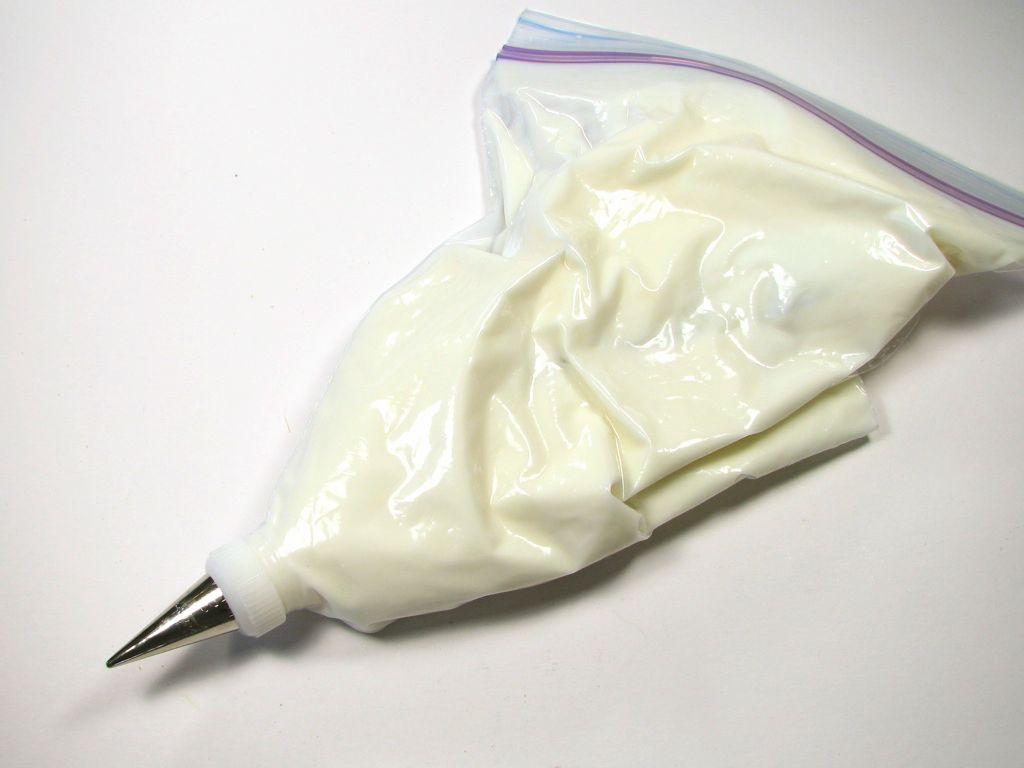
Pastry bag with convenience closure

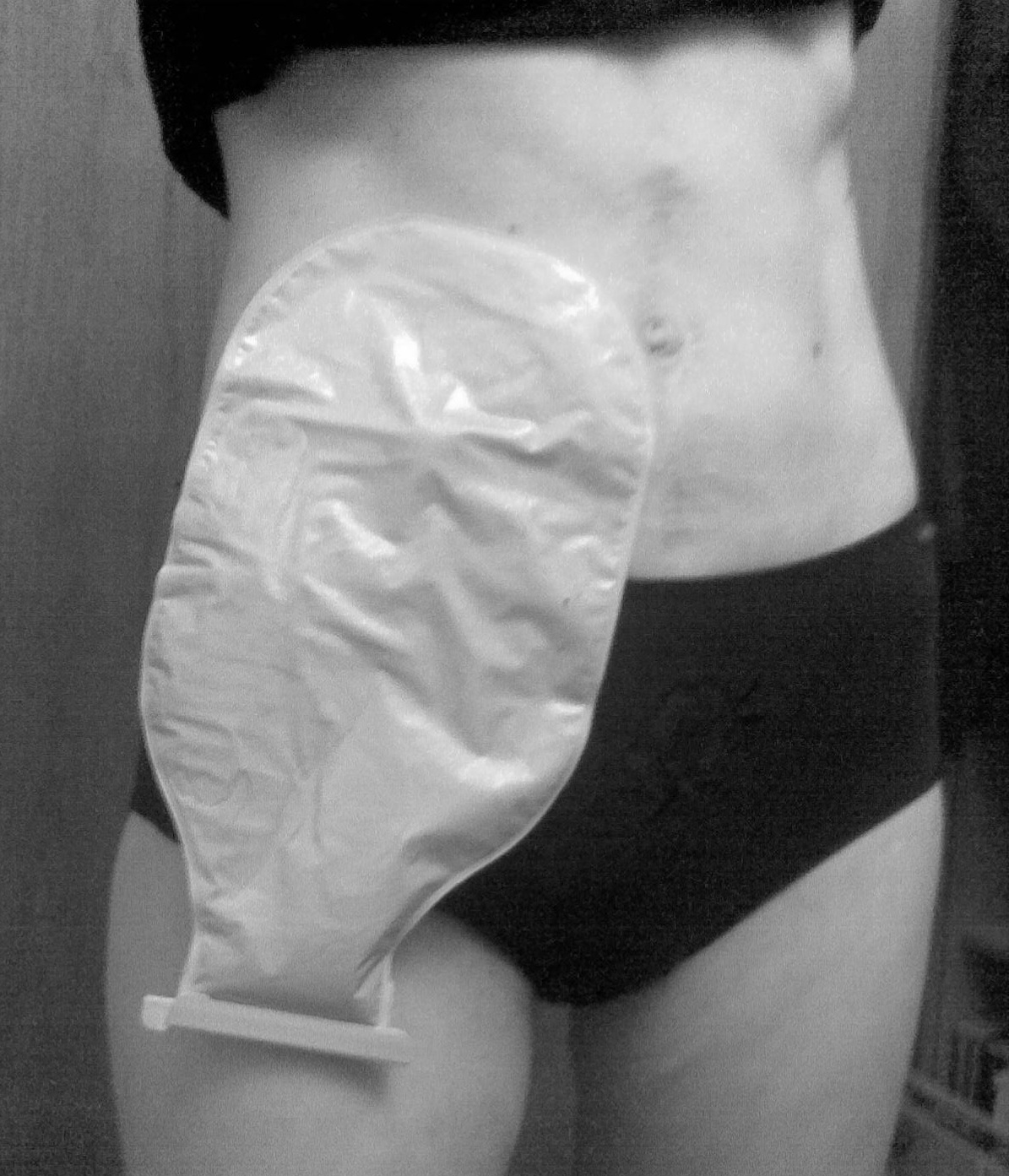
Ostomy bag

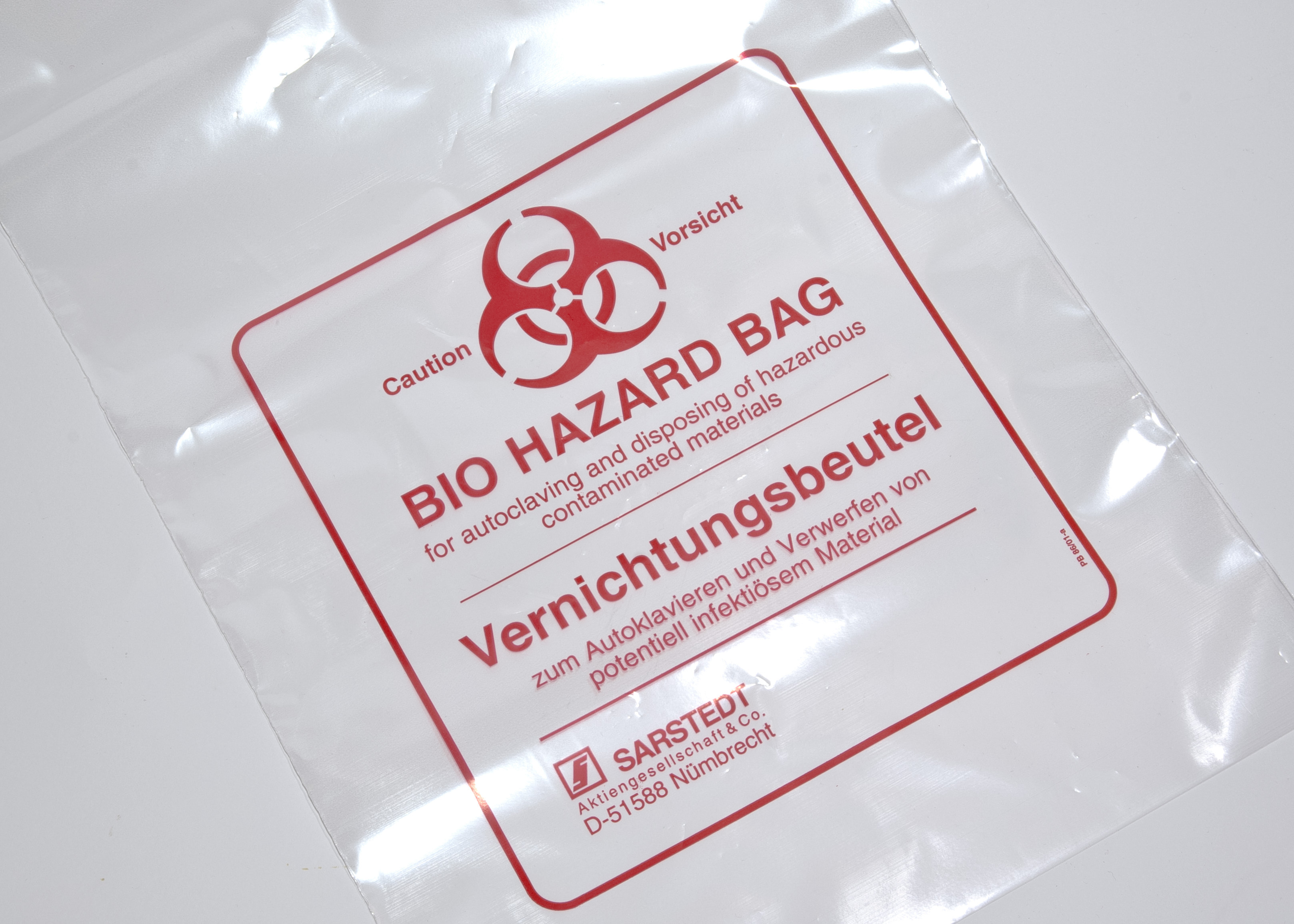
Biohazard bag

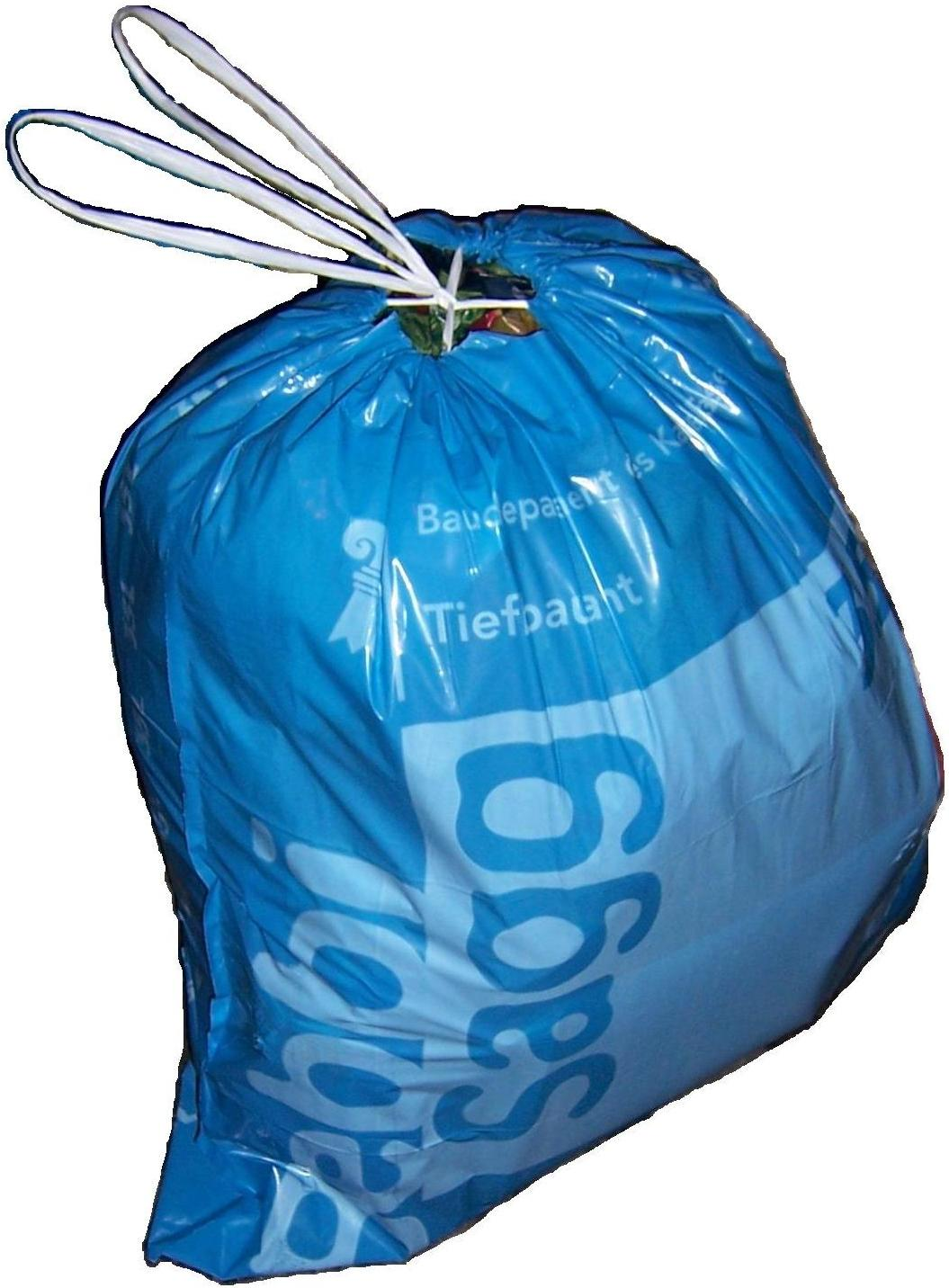
Bin bag or trash bag

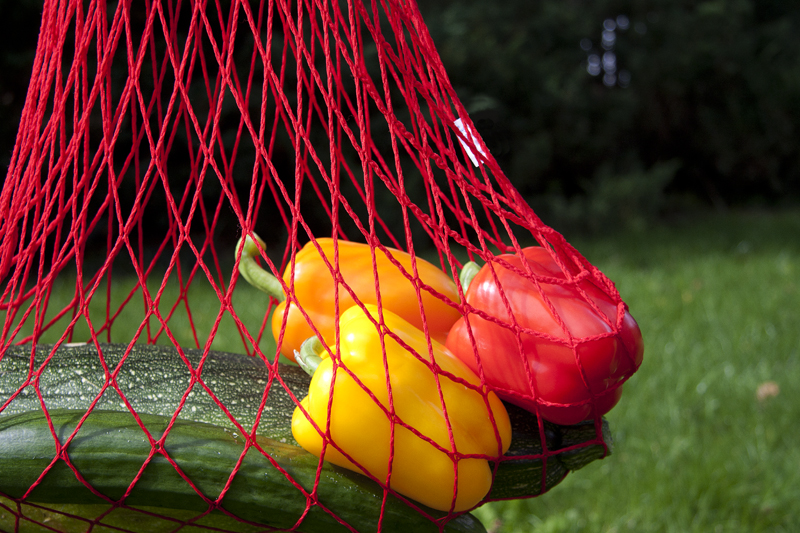
String bag made of plastic fibers

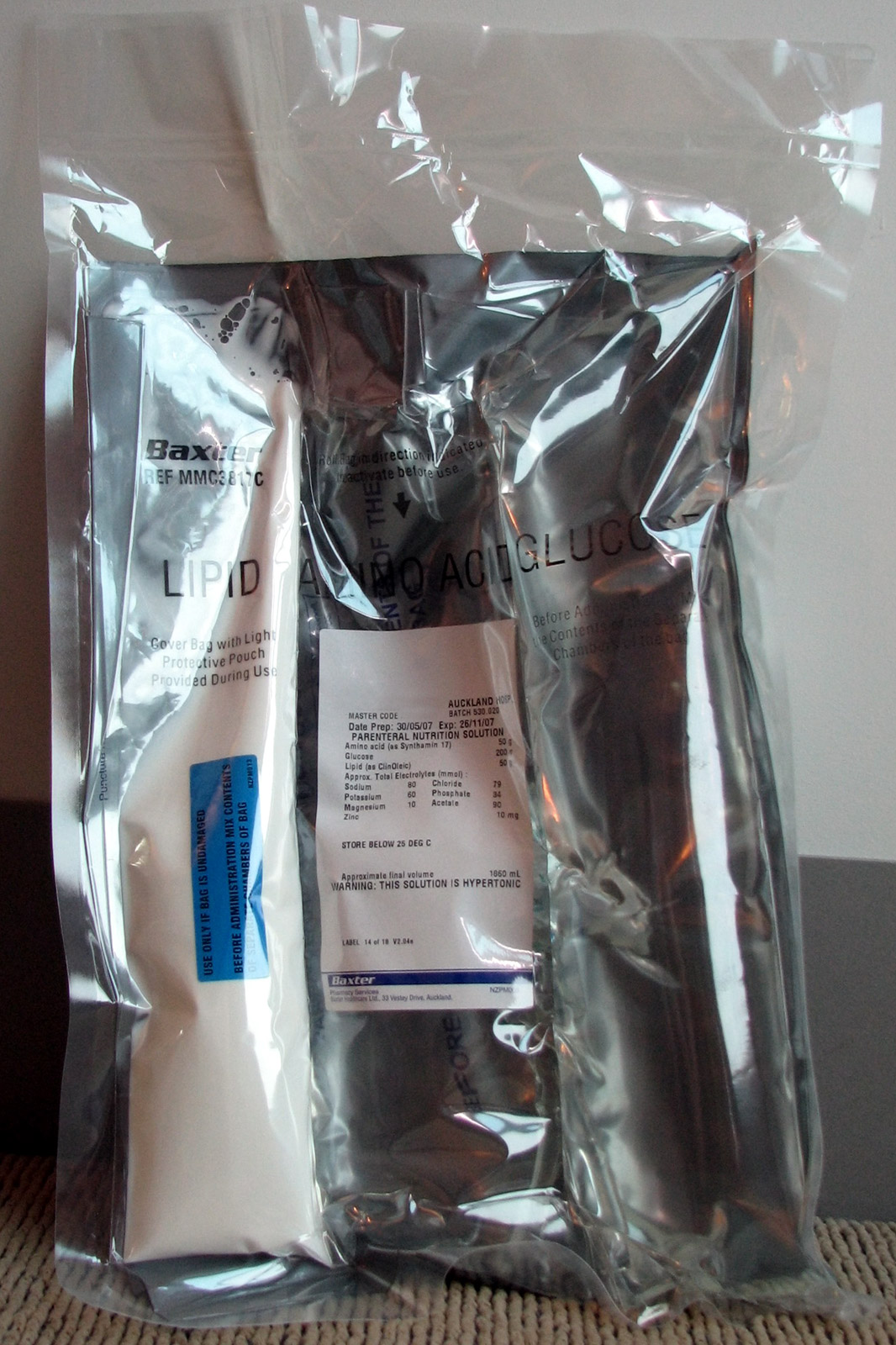
Multiple chambers for eventual mixing

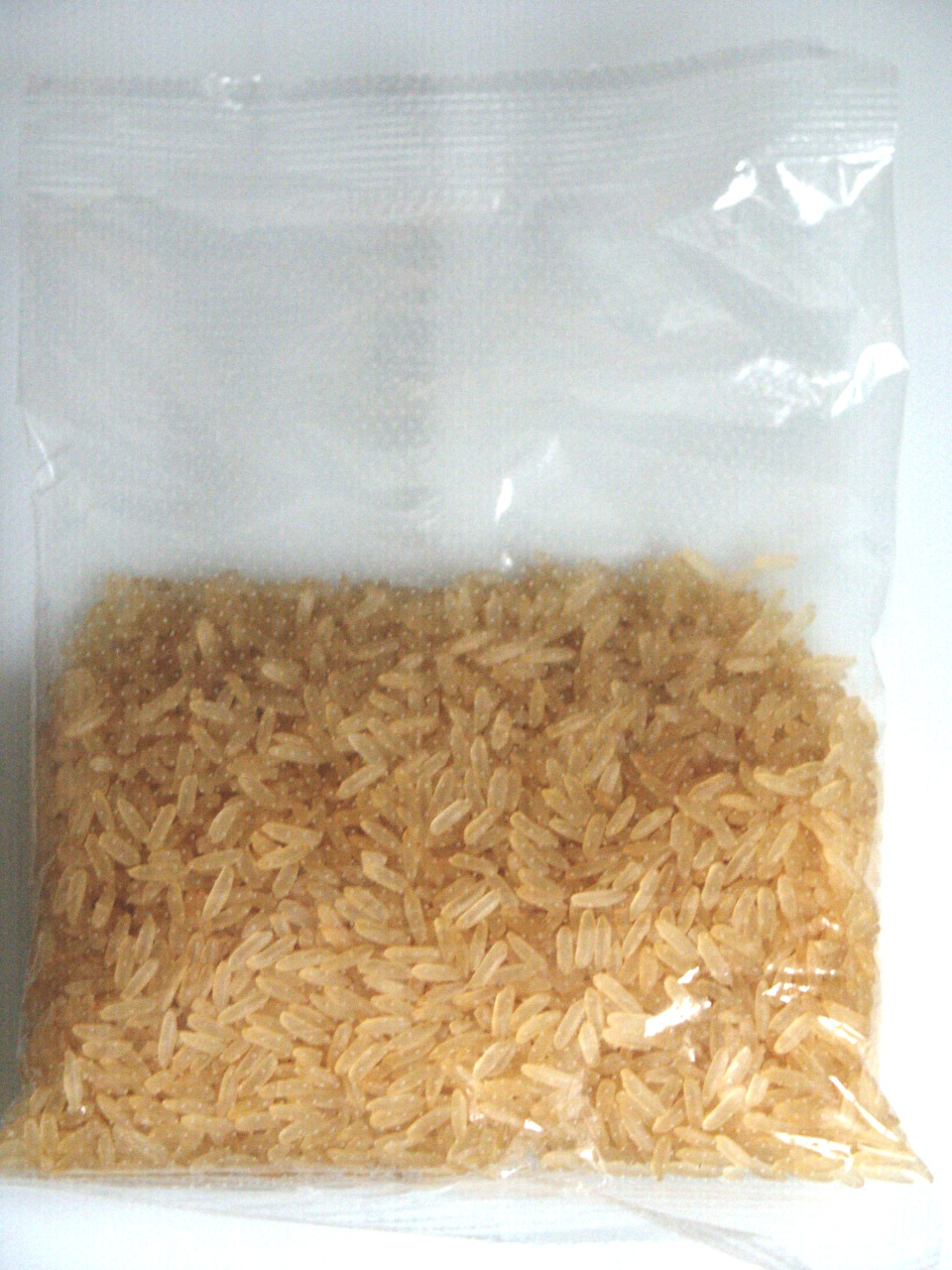
Porous bag for cooking rice

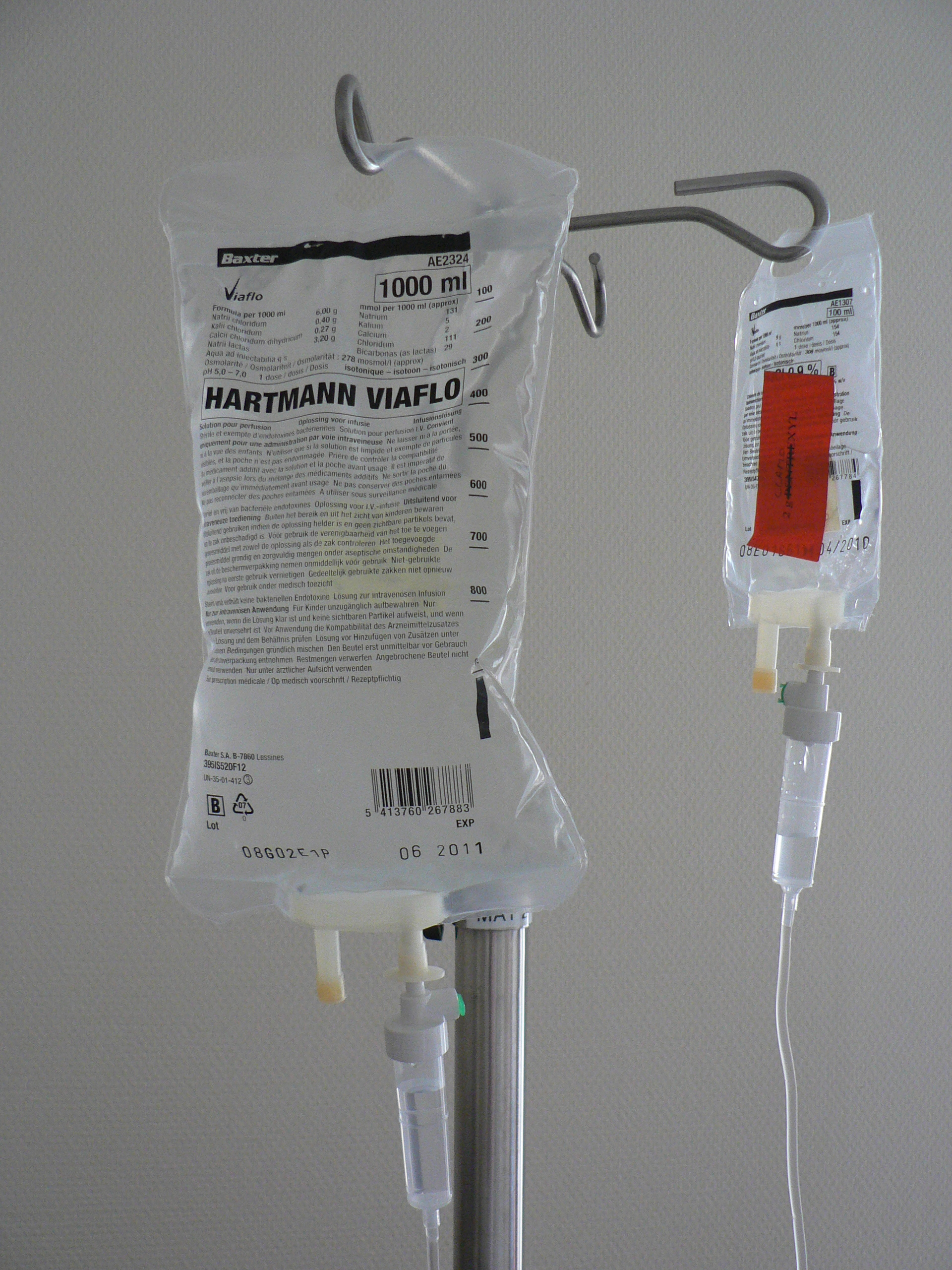
Intravenous therapy

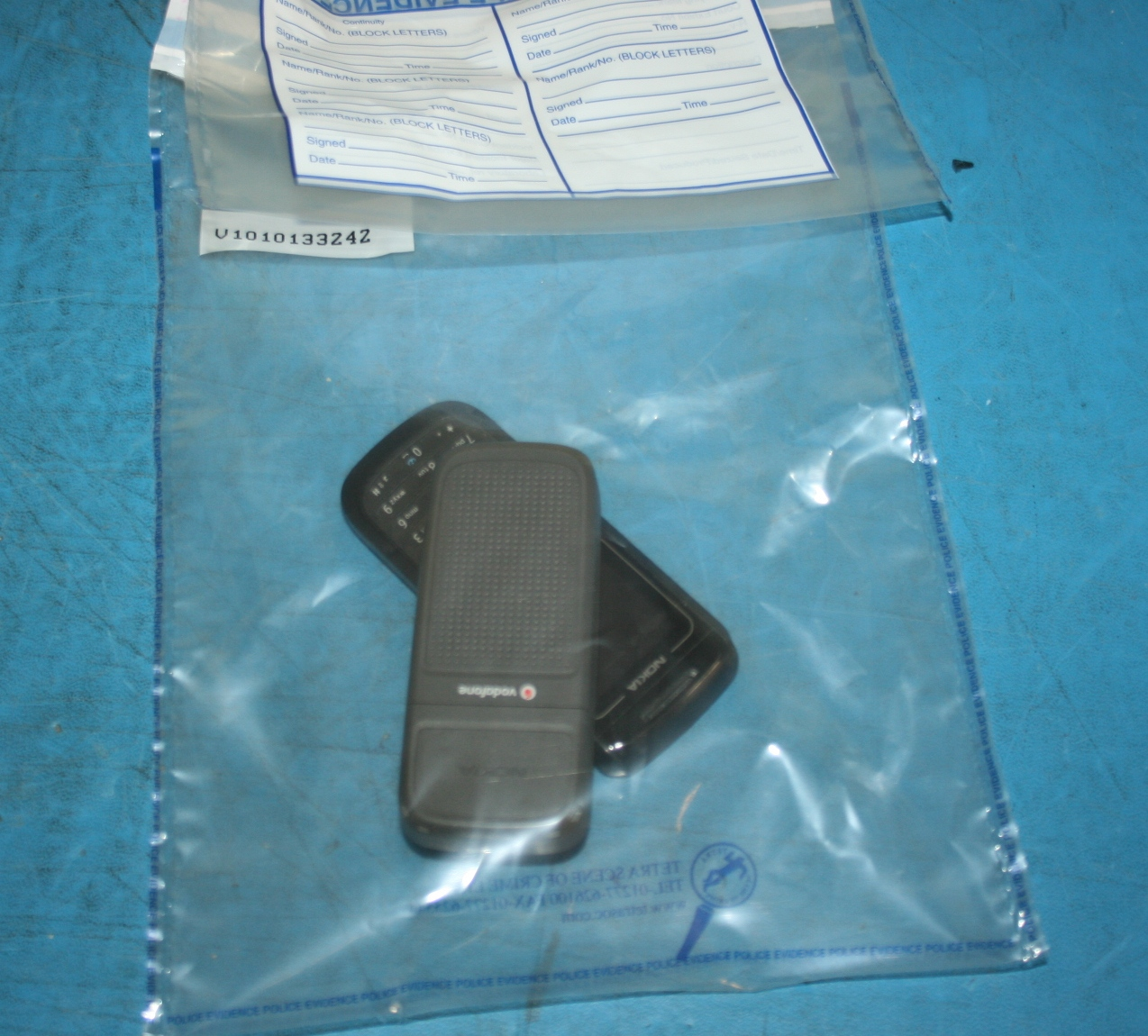
Tamper evident evidence bag

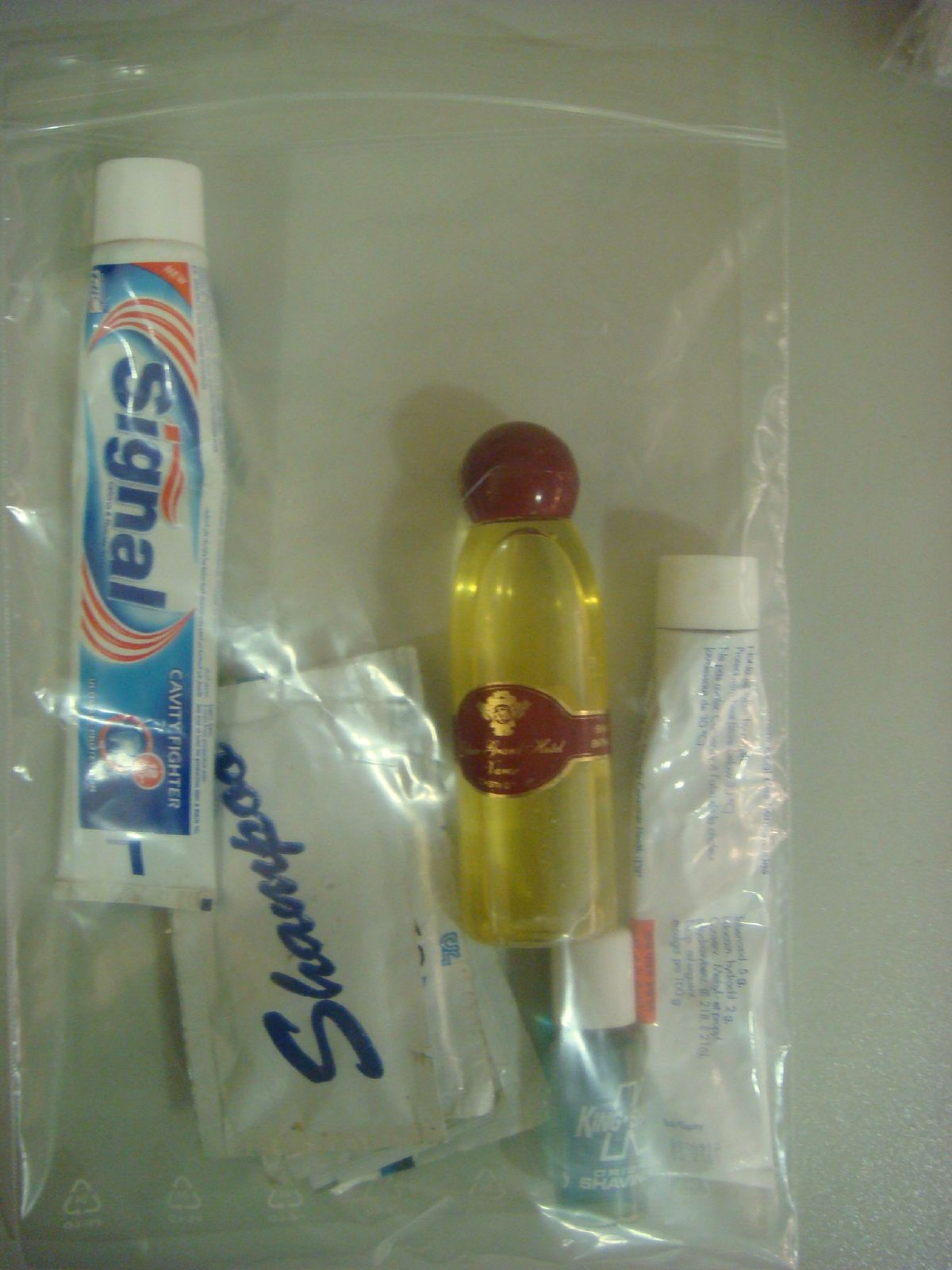
Travel toiletries in a reclosable plastic bag

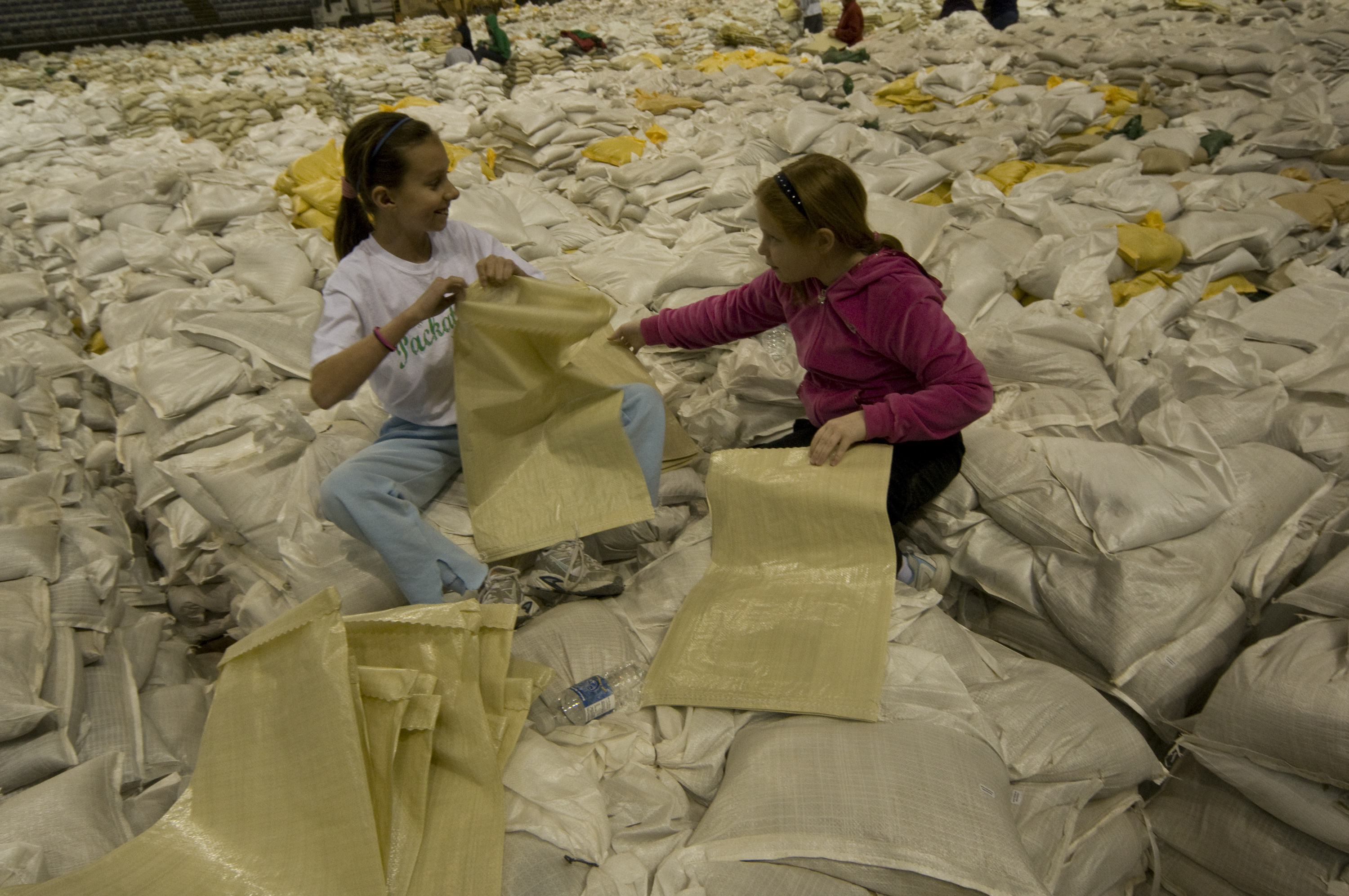
Woven plastic fiber bags used for sand

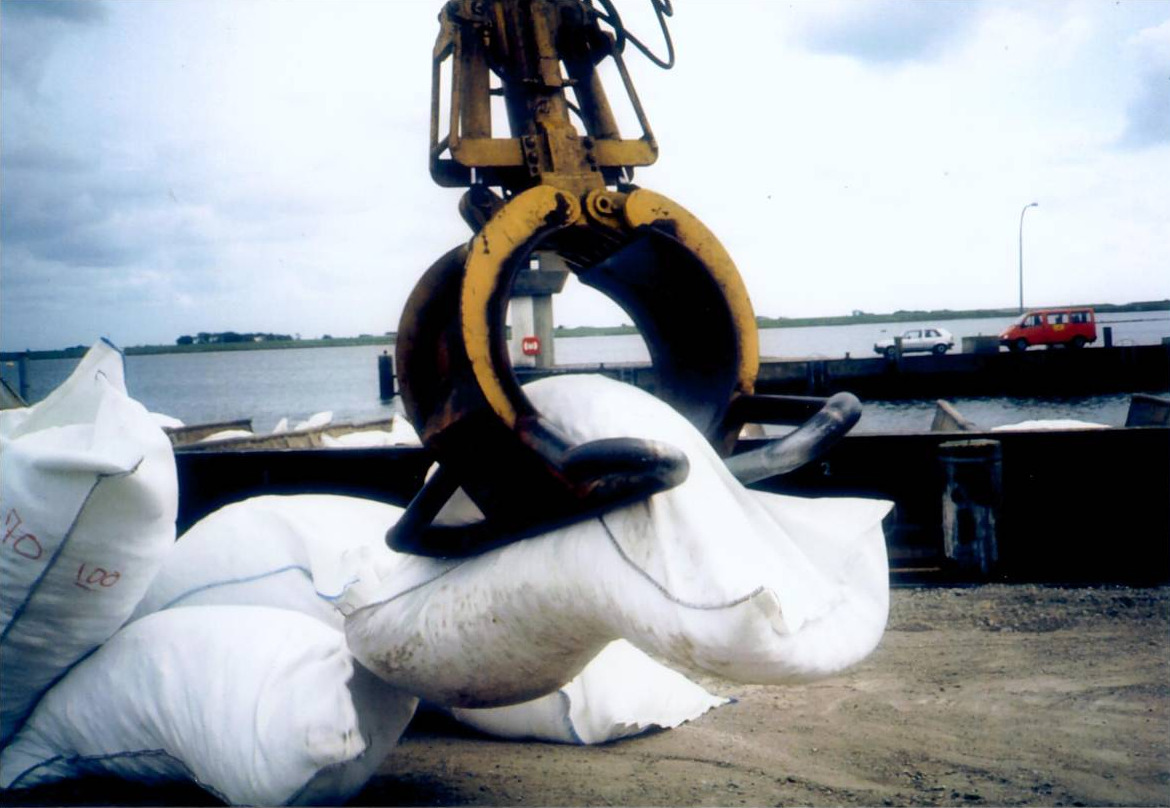
Nonwoven plastic, geotextile bags

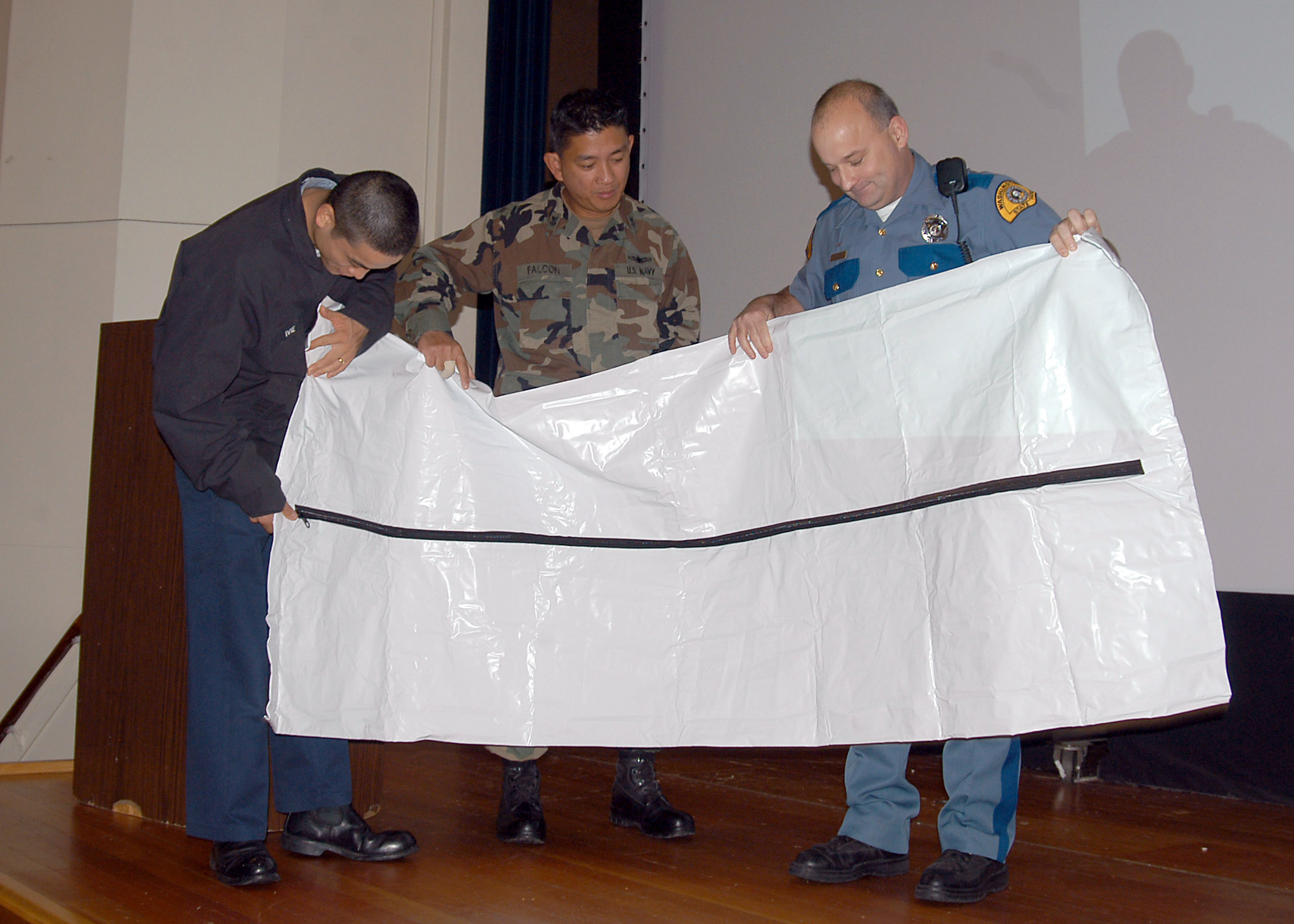
A plastic body bag

== See also ==
- Biodegradable polythene film
- Biodegradation
- Bioplastic
- Box wine
- Milk bag
- Photodegradation
- Refuse-derived fuel
- Zipper storage bag
- Cellophane
