= Biodegradable bag =

Bag capable of being decomposed

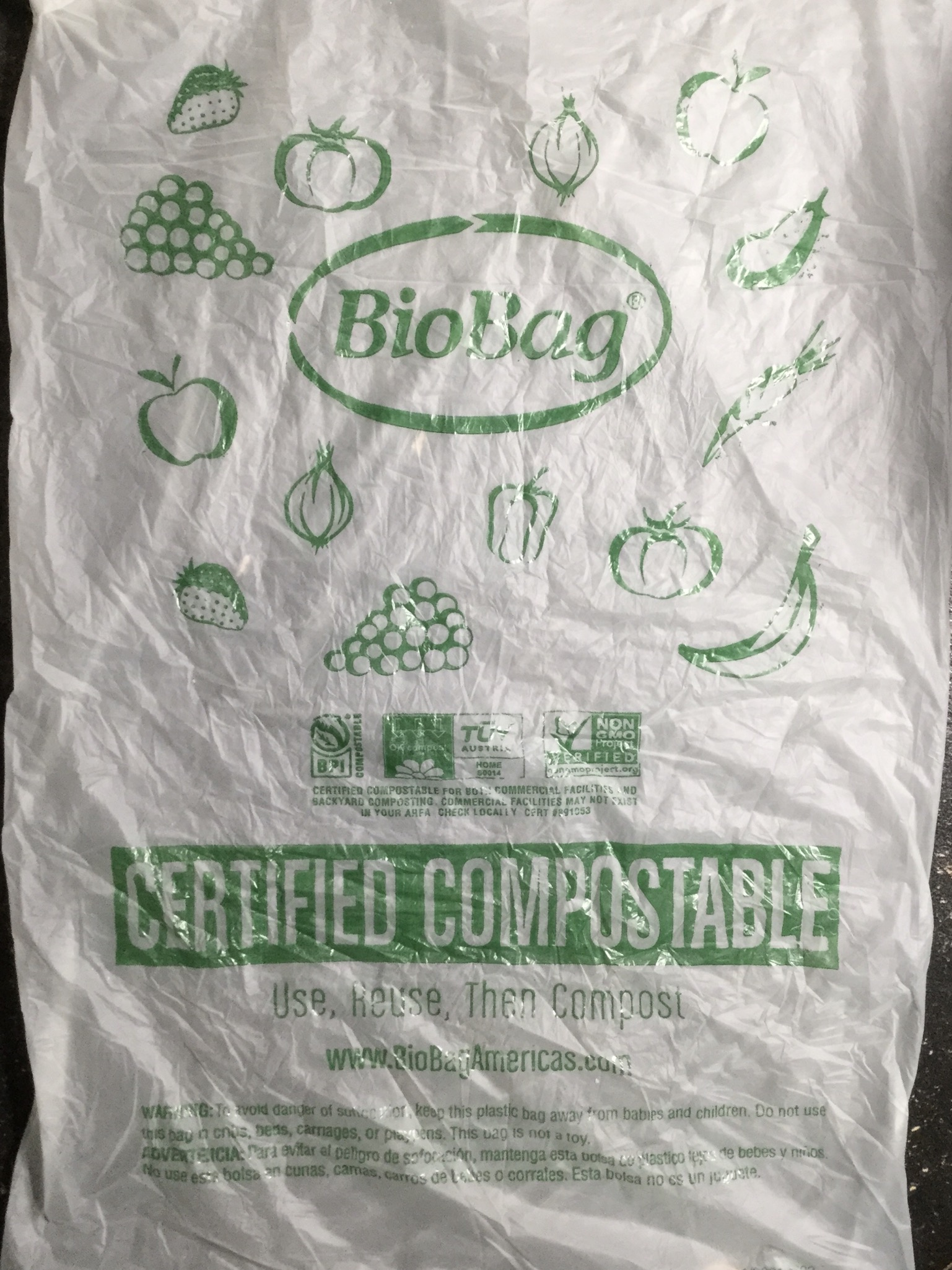
A single use compostable bag from a grocery store

Biodegradable bags are bags that are capable of being decomposed by bacteria or other living organisms.

Each year approximately 500 billion to 1 trillion plastic bags are used worldwide.

== Biodegradable vis-à-vis compostable ==
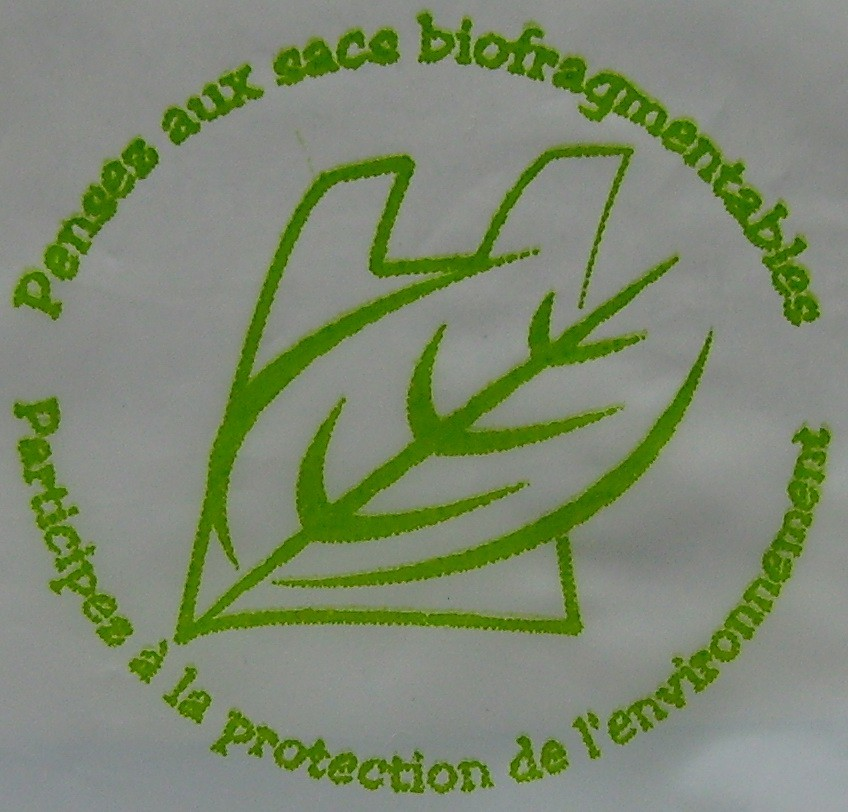
The seal of a biodegradable bag in French

In typical parlance, the word biodegradable is distinct in meaning from compostable. While biodegradable simply means an object is capable of being decomposed by bacteria or other living organisms, "compostable" in the plastic industry is defined as able to decompose in aerobic environments that are maintained under specific controlled temperature and humidity conditions. Compostable means capable of undergoing biological decomposition in a compost site such that the material is not visually distinguishable and breaks down into carbon dioxide, water, inorganic compounds and biomass at a rate consistent with known compostable materials. (ref: ASTM International D 6002)

The inclusion of "inorganic materials" precludes the end product from being considered as compost, or humus, which is purely organic material. Indeed, under the ASTM definition, the only criterion needed for a plastic to be called compostable is that it has to appear to go away at the same rate as something else that one already knows is compostable under the traditional definition.

Plastic bags can be made "oxo-biodegradable" by being manufactured from a normal plastic polymer (i.e. polyethylene) or polypropylene incorporating an additive which causes degradation and then biodegradation of the polymer (polyethylene) due to oxidation.

== Trade associations ==
The trade association for the oxo-biodegradable plastics industry is the Oxo-biodegradable Plastics Association, which will certify products tested according to ASTM D6954 or (starting 1 January 2010) UAE 5009:2009

The trade associations for the compostable plastics industry are the Biodegradable Products Institute, "European Bioplastics", and SPIBioplastics Council. Money is certified as compostable for industrial composting conditions in the United States if they comply with ASTM D6400, and in Europe with the EN13432.

== Materials ==
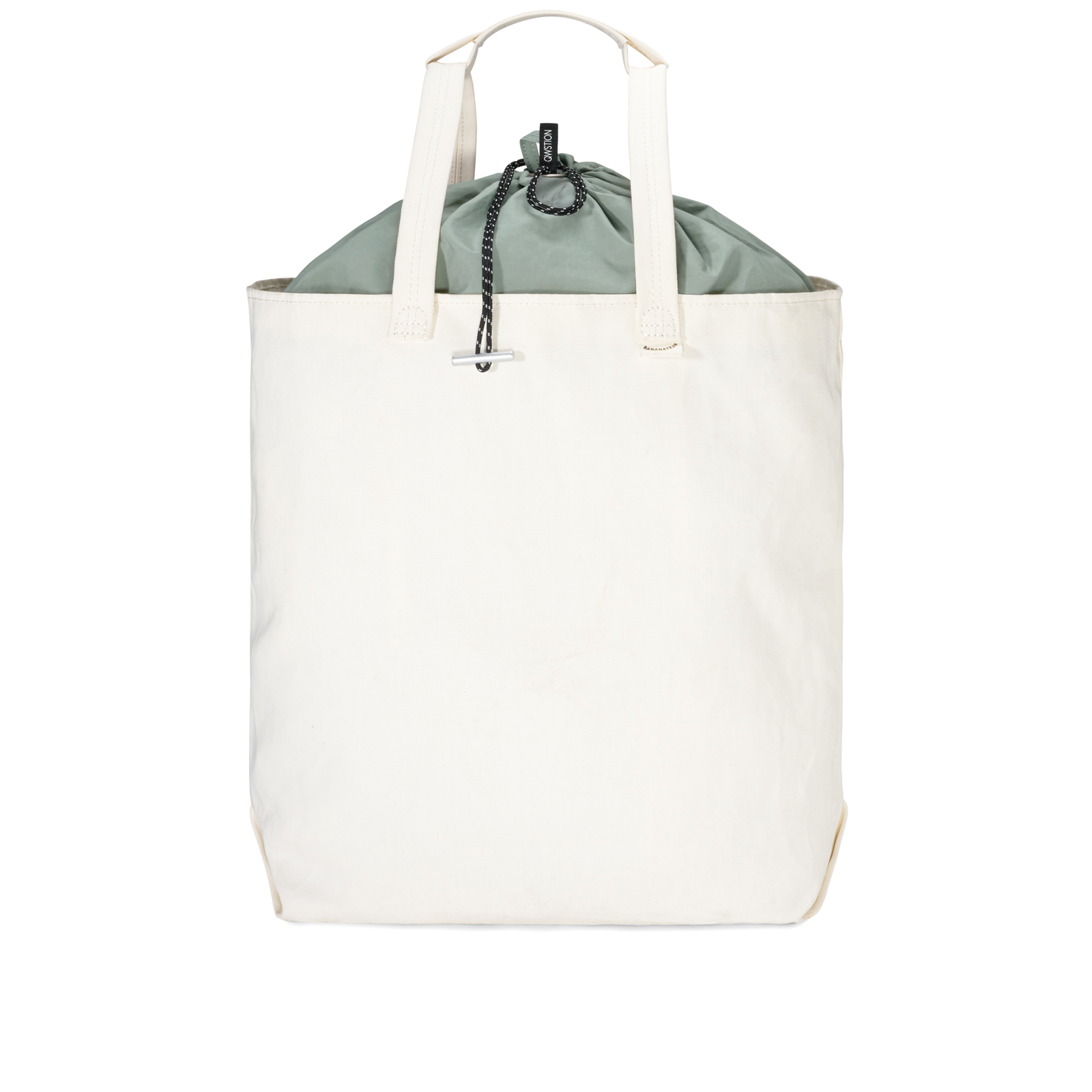
A tote bag made of Manilla hemp

Most bags that are manufactured from plastic are made from corn-based materials, like polylactic acid blends. Biodegradable plastic bags are nowadays as strong and reliable as traditional (mostly polyethylene)-bags. Many bags are also made from paper, organic materials like Manila hemp, or polycaprolactone.

"The public looks at biodegradable as something magical," even though the term is broadly used, according to Ramani Narayan, a chemical engineer at Michigan State University in East Lansing, and science consultant to the Biodegradable Plastics Institute. "This is the most used and abused and misused word in our dictionary right now. In the Great Pacific Garbage Patch, biodegradable plastics break up into small pieces that can more easily enter the food chain by being consumed."

Starch is a material used in the processing of biodegradable bags and packaging for various applications, such as food and heavy items, due to its renewable nature, low cost, and ability to be produced into custom-sized bags. Additionally, incorporating bioactive compounds such as antioxidants enables the production of active packaging for food applications.

== Recycling ==
In-plant scrap can often be recycled but post-consumer sorting and recycling is difficult. Bio-based polymers will contaminate the recycling of other more common polymers. While oxo-biodegradable plastic manufacturers claim that their bags are recyclable, many plastic film recyclers will not accept them, as there have been no long-term studies on the viability of recycled-content products with these additives. Further, the Biodegradable Plastics Institute (BPI) says that the formulation of additives in oxo films varies greatly, which introduces even more variability in the recycling process. SPI Resin identification code 7 is applicable.

== Marketing qualification and legal issues ==
Since many of these plastics require access to sunlight, oxygen, or lengthy periods of time to achieve degradation or biodegradation, the U.S. Federal Trade Commission's Guides for the Use of Environmental Marketing Claims, commonly called the "green guide", require proper marking of these products to show their performance limits.

The Federal Trade Commission provides an example:

Example 1: A trash bag is marketed as "degradable," with no qualification or other disclosure. The marketer relies on soil burial tests to show that the product will decompose in the presence of water and oxygen. The trash bags are customarily disposed of in incineration facilities or at sanitary landfills that are managed in a way that inhibits degradation by minimizing moisture and oxygen. Degradation will be irrelevant for those trash bags that are incinerated and, for those disposed of in landfills, the marketer does not possess adequate substantiation that the bags will degrade in a reasonably short period of time in a landfill. The claim is therefore deceptive.

Since there are no pass-fail tests for "biodegradable" plastic bags, manufacturers must print on the product the environmental requirements for biodegradation to take place, time frame and end results in order to be within US Trade Requirements.

In 2007, the State of California essentially made the term "biodegradable bags" illegal, unless such terms are "substantiated by competent and reliable evidence to prevent deceiving or misleading consumers about environmental impact of degradable, compostable, and biodegradable plastic bags, food service ware, and packaging."

In 2010, an Australian manufacturer of plastic bags who made unsubstantiated or unqualified claims about biodegradability was fined by the Australian Competition & Consumer Commission, which is the Australian equivalent of the U.S. Federal Trade Commission.

In recent years, the Biodegradable Products Institute and related companies have claimed products compost in available compost facilities at 60 °C (140 °F). The Vermont attorney general found these claims to be misleading and sued compostable plastic companies for false claims.

== See also ==
- Starch
- Sustainability
- Waste management
