= Parchment paper =

Cellulose-based paper used in baking and cooking

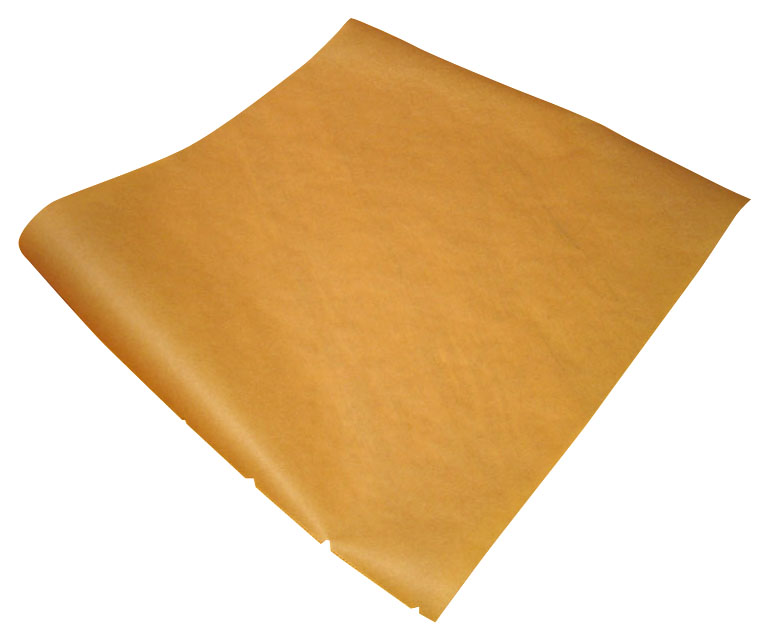
Parchment paper for baking

Parchment paper, also known as baking paper, is a cellulose-based paper whose material has been processed so as to obtain additional properties such as non-stickiness, grease resistance, humidity resistance, and heat resistance. It is commonly used in baking and cooking as a disposable non-stick paper. It is greaseproof paper that can be used for several different applications, its surface prevents the food from sticking, and also is highly heat-resistant with some brands capable of temperatures up to 420 °F (216 °C). It should not be confused with waxed paper, which is paper that has been coated with wax.

== Manufacturing ==
To get its non-stick properties, baking paper is either, treated with quilon, a trademark for a solution of chromium(iii) in an acidic alcohol to modify the cellulose, or coated with silicone.

== Applications in cooking and baking ==
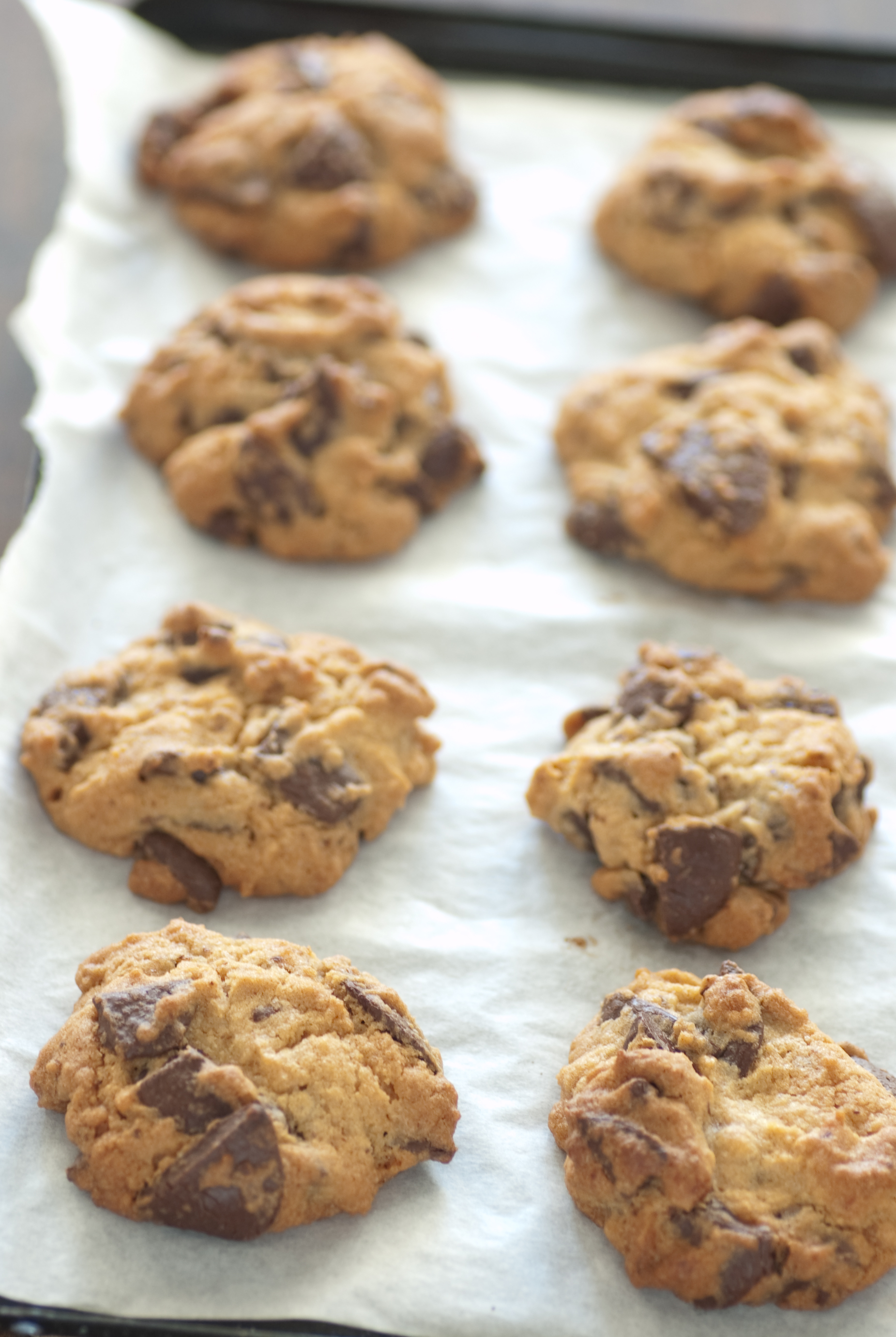
Chocolate chip cookies on baking parchment paper

A common use is to eliminate the need to grease sheet pans, allowing very rapid turnaround of batches of baked goods with minimal cleanup. Parchment paper is also used to cook en papillote, a technique where food is steamed or cooked within closed pouches made from parchment paper.

Parchment paper can be used in most applications that call for wax paper as a non-stick surface. The reverse is not true, as using wax paper would cause smoke in the oven and would adversely affect flavor.

== Other bakery release papers ==
The non-stick properties can be also achieved by employing a coated paper, onto which a suitable release agent—a coating with a low surface energy and the capability to withstand the temperatures involved in the baking or roasting process—is deposited; silicone (cured with a suitable catalyst) is frequently used.

== Other applications ==
Parchment paper also has relevant properties for other industries. In the textile tube industry, an outer layer of parchment confers the necessary resistance to abrasion, heat and oil. In other industries, parchment is used as a processing aid due to its release properties, whether for furniture laminate manufacturing and rubber vulcanization.

In creative forms such as origami, thin uncoated parchment paper is often used for tessellations and complex models.

== Disposal ==
The nonstick treatment may render the paper uncompostable, depending on the materials used. Silicone coated parchment paper is not compostable because silicone does not break down during composting. Quilon coated parchment paper contains trivalent chromium, which may raise soil chromium levels above safe levels.

== See also ==
- Coated paper
- Dough
- Greaseproof paper
- Release liner
