= Induction sealing =

Process of bonding thermoplastic materials by induction heating

Induction sealing is the process of bonding thermoplastic materials by induction heating. This involves controlled heating an electrically conducting object (usually aluminum foil) by electromagnetic induction, through heat generated in the object by eddy currents.

Induction sealing is used in many types of manufacturing. In packaging, it is used for package fabrication such as forming tubes from flexible materials, attaching plastic closures to package forms, etc. Perhaps the most common use of induction sealing is cap sealing, a non-contact method of heating an inner seal to hermetically seal the top of plastic and glass containers. This sealing process takes place after the container has been filled and capped.

== Sealing process ==
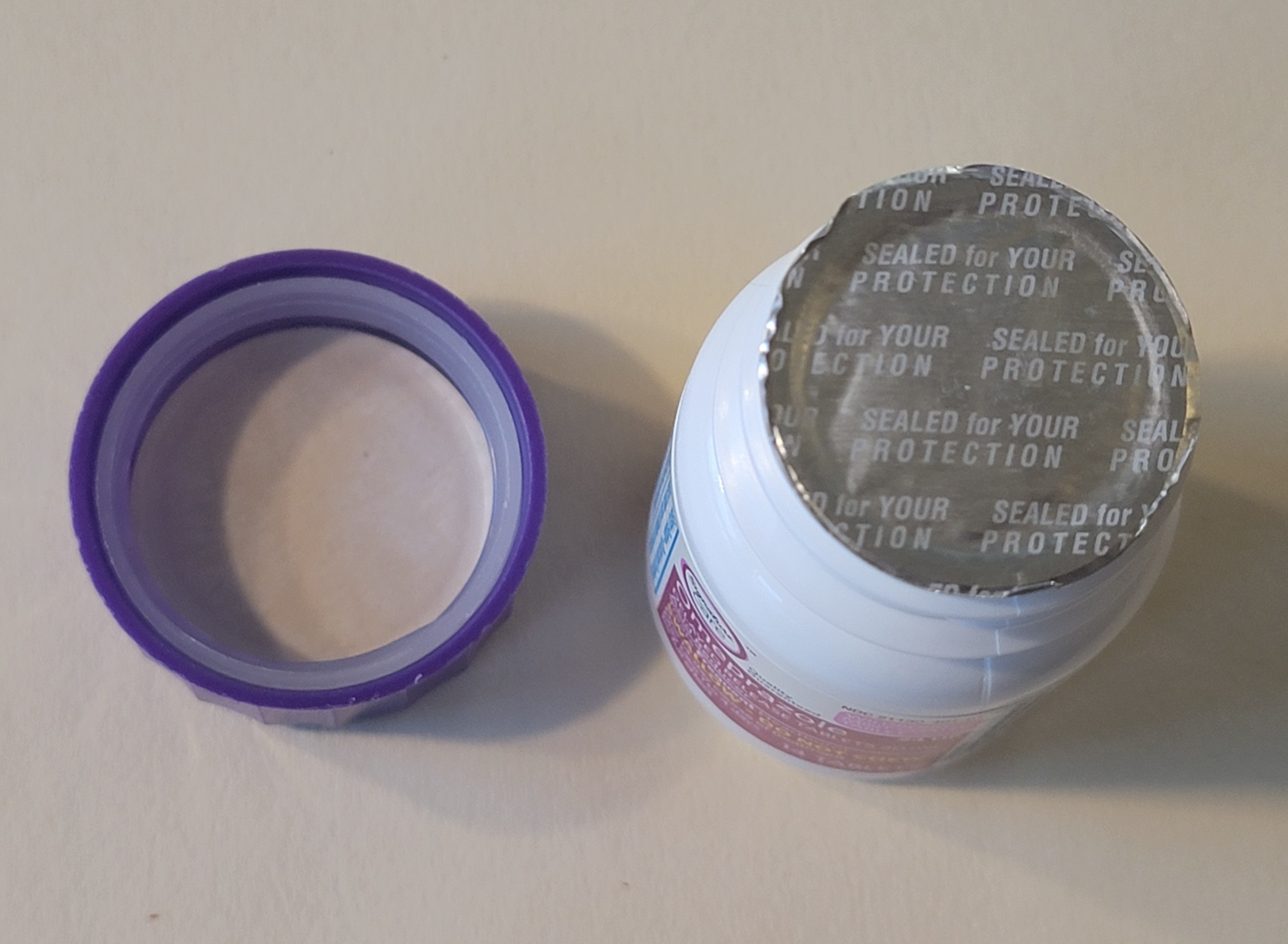
Induction sealed bottle

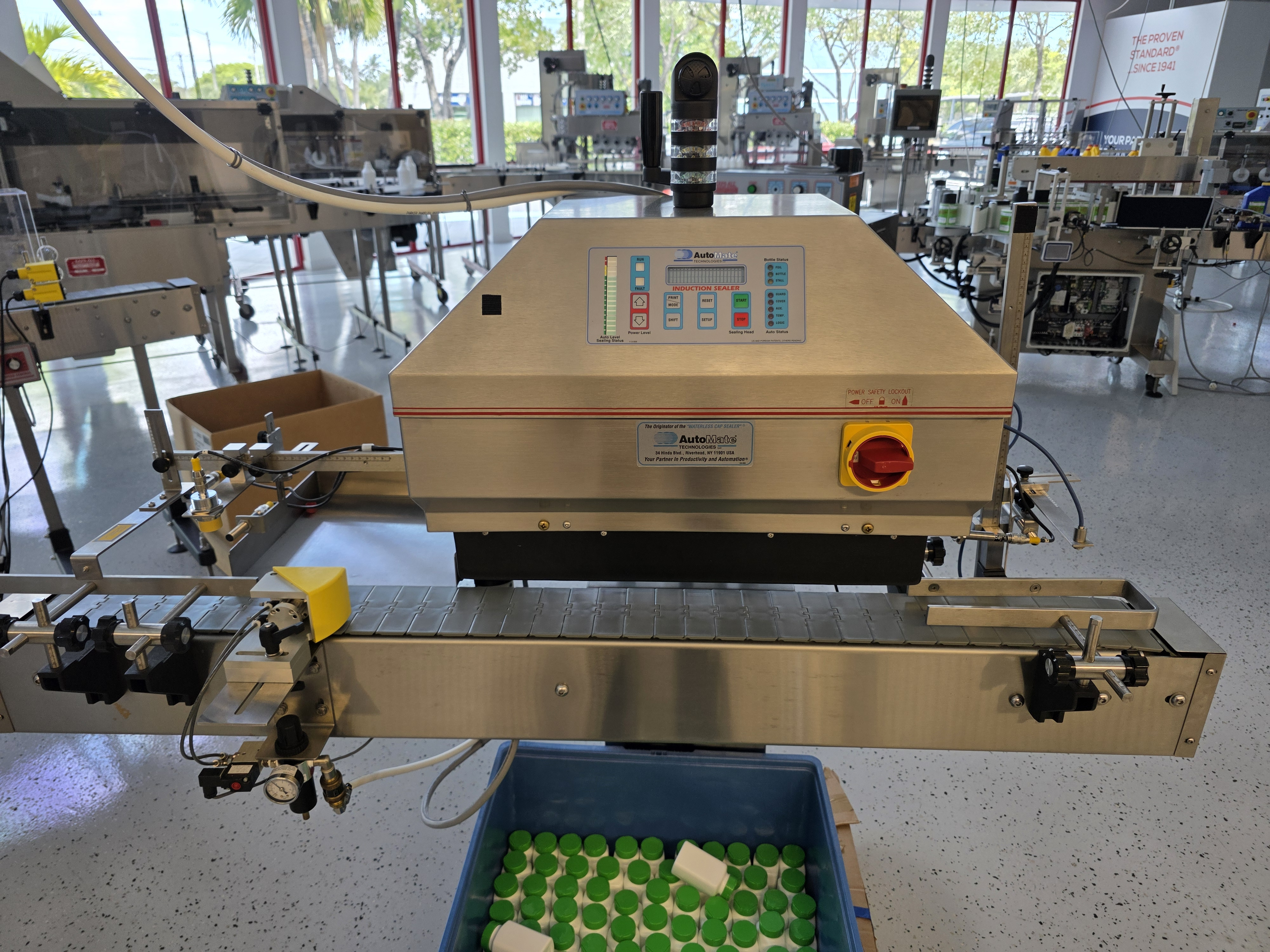
An induction foil sealer

The closure is supplied to the bottler with an aluminum foil layer liner already inserted. Although there are various liners to choose from, a typical induction liner is multi-layered. The top layer is a paper pulp that is generally spot-glued to the cap. The next layer is wax that is used to bond a layer of aluminum foil to the pulp. The bottom layer is a polymer film laminated to the foil. After the cap or closure is applied, the container passes under an induction coil, which emits an oscillating electromagnetic field. As the container passes under the induction coil (sealing head), the conductive aluminum foil liner begins to heat as a result of the eddy currents being induced. The heat melts the wax, which is absorbed into the pulp backing and releases the foil from the cap. The polymer film also heats and flows onto the lip of the container. When cooled, the polymer creates a bond with the container resulting in a hermetically sealed product. Neither the container nor its contents are negatively affected, and the heat generated does not harm the contents.

It is possible to overheat the foil and thereby cause damage to the seal layer and to any protective barriers. This could result in faulty seals, even weeks after the initial sealing process, so proper sizing of the induction sealing is vital to determine the exact system necessary to run a particular product.

Sealing can be done with either a handheld unit or on a conveyor system. A more recent development (which better suits a small number of applications) allows for induction sealing to be used to apply a foil seal to a container without the need for a closure. In this case, foil is supplied pre-cut or in a reel. Where supplied in a reel, it is die cut and transferred onto the container neck. When the foil is in place, it is pressed down by the seal head, the induction cycle is activated, and the seal is bonded to the container. This process is known as direct application or sometimes "capless" induction sealing.

== Potential uses ==
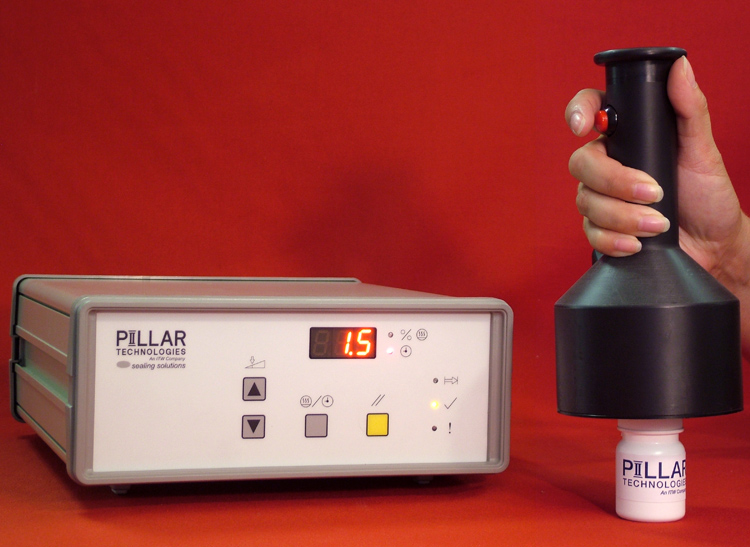
A hand held induction sealer

There are a variety of reasons companies choose to use induction sealing:

- Tamper evidence
- Leak prevention
- Freshness retention
- Protection against package pilferage
- Sustainability
- Production speed

=== Tamper evidence ===
With the U.S. Food and Drug Administration (FDA) regulations concerning tamper-resistant packaging, pharmaceutical packagers must find ways to comply as outlined in Sec. 450.500 Tamper-Resistant Packaging Requirements for Certain over-the-counter (OTC) Human Drug Products (CPG 7132a.17).

Induction sealing systems meet or exceed these government regulations. As stated in section 6 of Packaging Systems:

"...6. CONTAINER MOUTH INNER SEALS. Paper, thermal plastic, plastic film, foil, or a combination thereof, is sealed to the mouth of a container (e.g., bottle) under the cap. The seal must be torn or broken to open the container and remove the product. The seal cannot be removed and reapplied without leaving visible evidence of entry. Seals applied by heat induction to plastic containers appear to offer a higher degree of tamper-resistance than those that depend on an adhesive to create the bond..."

=== Leak prevention/protection ===
A common application for flat sealing heads are to seal containers in the food and beverage industry to prevent leaks and extend shelf life.

Some shipping companies require liquid chemical products to be sealed prior to shipping to prevent hazardous chemicals from spilling on other shipments.

=== Freshness ===
Induction sealing keeps unwanted pollutants from seeping into food products and may assist in extending shelf life of certain products.

=== Pilferage protection ===
Induction-sealed containers help prevent the product from being broken into by leaving a noticeable residue on plastic containers from the liner itself. Pharmaceutical companies purchase liners that will purposely leave liner film/foil residue on bottles. Food companies that use induction seals do not want the liner residue as it could potentially interfere with the product itself upon dispensing. They, in turn, put a notice on the product that it has been induction-sealed for their protection; letting the consumer know it was sealed upon leaving the factory and they should check for an intact seal before using.

=== Sustainability ===
In some applications, induction sealing can be considered to contribute towards sustainability goals by allowing lower bottle weights as the pack relies on the presence of an induction foil seal for its security, rather than a mechanically strong bottle neck and closure.

=== Induction heating analysis ===
Some manufacturers have produced devices which can monitor the magnetic field strength present at the induction head (either directly or indirectly via such mechanisms as pick up coils), dynamically predicting the heating effect in the foil. Such devices provide quantifiable data post-weld in a production environment where uniformity – particularly in parameters such as foil peel-off strength, is important. Analysers may be portable or designed to work in conjunction with conveyor belt systems.

High speed power analysis techniques (voltage and current measurement in near real time) can be used to intercept power delivery from mains to generator or generator to head in order to calculate energy delivered to the foil and the statistical profile of that process. As the thermal capacity of the foil is typically static, such information as true power, apparent power and power factor may be used to predict foil heating with good relevance to final weld parameters and in a dynamic manner.

Many other derivative parameters may be calculated for each weld, yielding confidence in a production environment that is notably more difficult to achieve in conduction transfer systems, where analysis, if present is generally post-weld as relatively large thermal mass of heating and conduction elements combined impair rapid temperature change. Inductive heating with quantitative feedback such as that provided by power analysis techniques further allows for the possibility of dynamic adjustments in energy delivery profile to the target. This opens the possibility of feed-forward systems where the induction generator properties are adjusted in near real-time as the heating process proceeds, allowing for a specific heating profile track and subsequent compliance feedback – something that is not generally practical for conduction heating processes.

=== Benefits of induction vs. conduction sealing ===
Conduction sealing requires a hard metal plate to make perfect contact with the container being sealed. Conduction sealing systems delay production time because of required system warm-up time. They also have complex temperature sensors and heaters.

Unlike conduction sealing systems, induction sealing systems require very little power resources, deliver instant startup time, and have a sealing head which can conform to "out of specification" containers when sealing.

Induction sealing also offers advantages when sealing to glass: Using a conduction sealer to seal a simple foil structure to glass gives no tolerance or compressibility to allow for any irregularity in the glass surface finish. With an induction sealer, the contact face can be of a compressible material, ensuring a perfect bond each time.

== Real-world applications of induction sealing ==
Induction sealing is broadly used to preserve the freshness and integrity of various products, such as:

- Sauces, jams, and condiments
- Dairy products, including milk and yogurt containers
- Beverages, such as water, coffee, tea, and juices
- Nutritional supplements
- Ready-to-eat meals, soups, and other food products
- Pet food and animal care products
- Medications and other pharmaceuticals
- Cosmetics, such as shampoos and conditioners
- Skin care products, such as lotions, creams, and serums
- Various chemical substances, including cleaning agents, pesticides, and fertilizers
- Pastes, adhesives, sealants, paints, and coatings
- Lubricants and greases
- Sporting goods supplies

== History ==
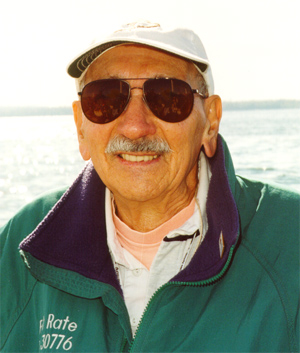
Induction Sealing inventor Jack Palmer (circa 1995)

- 1957–1958 – Original concept and method for induction sealing is conceived and proven by Jack Palmer (a process engineer at that time for the FR Corporation – Bronx, NY) as a means of solving liquid leakage from polyethylene bottles during shipment
- 1960 – U.S. patent 2,937,481 is awarded to Jack Palmer, in which his concept and process of induction sealing is made public
- Mid-1960s – Induction sealing is used worldwide
- 1973 – First solid-state cap sealer introduced
- 1982 – Chicago Tylenol murders
- 1983 – First transistorized air-cooled power supply for induction cap sealing
- 1985 – Universal coil technology debuted
- 1992 – Water-cooled, IGBT-based sealer introduced
- 1997 – Waterless cap sealers introduced (half the size and relatively maintenance-free)
- 2004 – 6 kW system introduced
