= Waxed paper roses =

Making waxed paper roses was a favourite hobby among Sri Lankan women. This hobby lasted until the late 1960s. Most women were homebound housewives who got involved in many such hobbies.

Until recent decades few housewives were employed outside the home. These women found hobbies to occupy themselves during the day when the house chores were finished. Today most of these hobbies have become commercialized and are conducted as businesses.

These roses brought income to the housewives. The waxed paper roses adorned many homes. Unlike in previous years most of the materials needed for such hobbies are now freely available at hardware stores and bookshops.
