= Waxtite =

Type of waxed-paper packaging system

Waxtite, also WaxTite is the trade name of the heat-sealed waxed-paper packaging system that was used by Will Keith Kellogg in 1914, around the outside of their cereal boxes. Subsequently, the Waxtite packaging was moved inside the box.
