= Plastic shopping bag =

Type of shopping bag

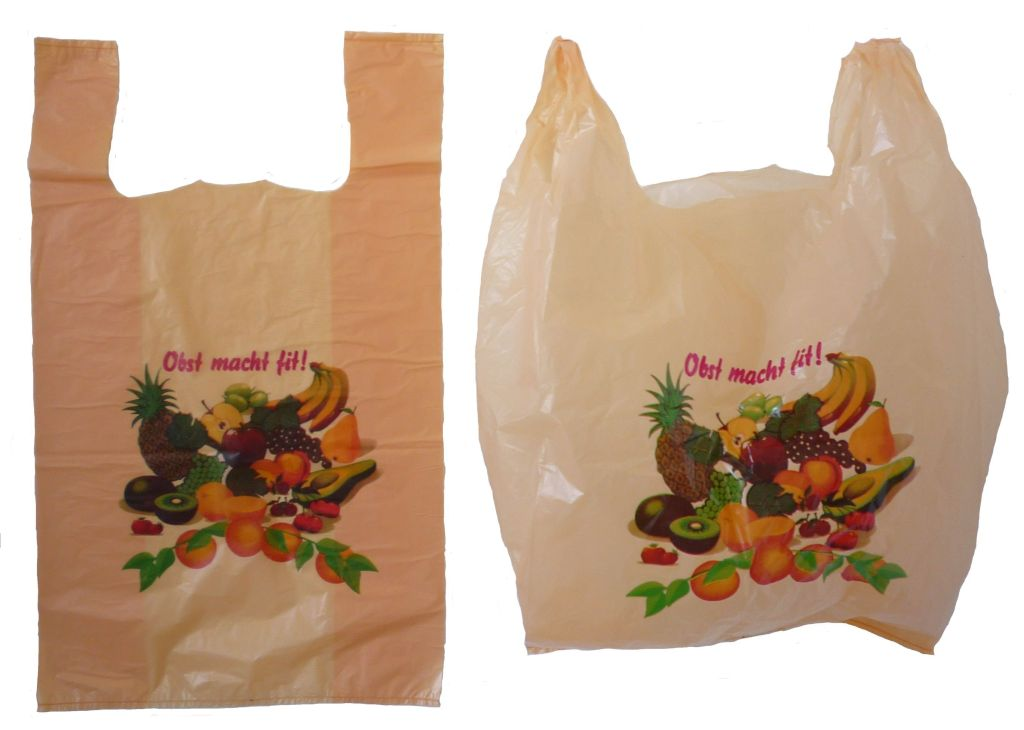
- A German plastic shopping bag with the phrase Obst macht fit! (Fruit makes you fit!). Before use (left) and after use (right), 2011

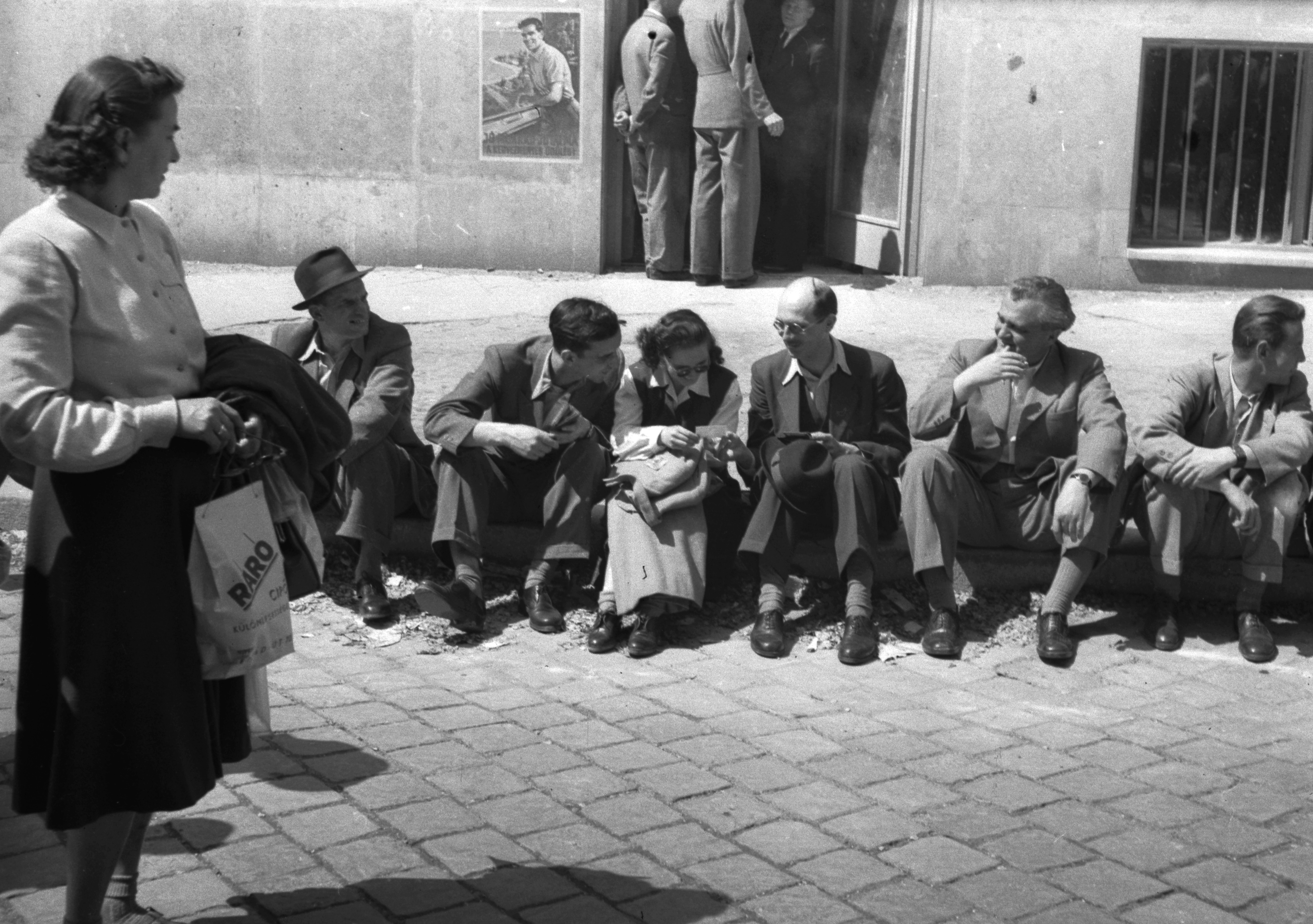
- Plastic shopping bag in context A woman (left) holding a composite plastic shopping bag, Hungary, 1947. Image from the Fortepan archives

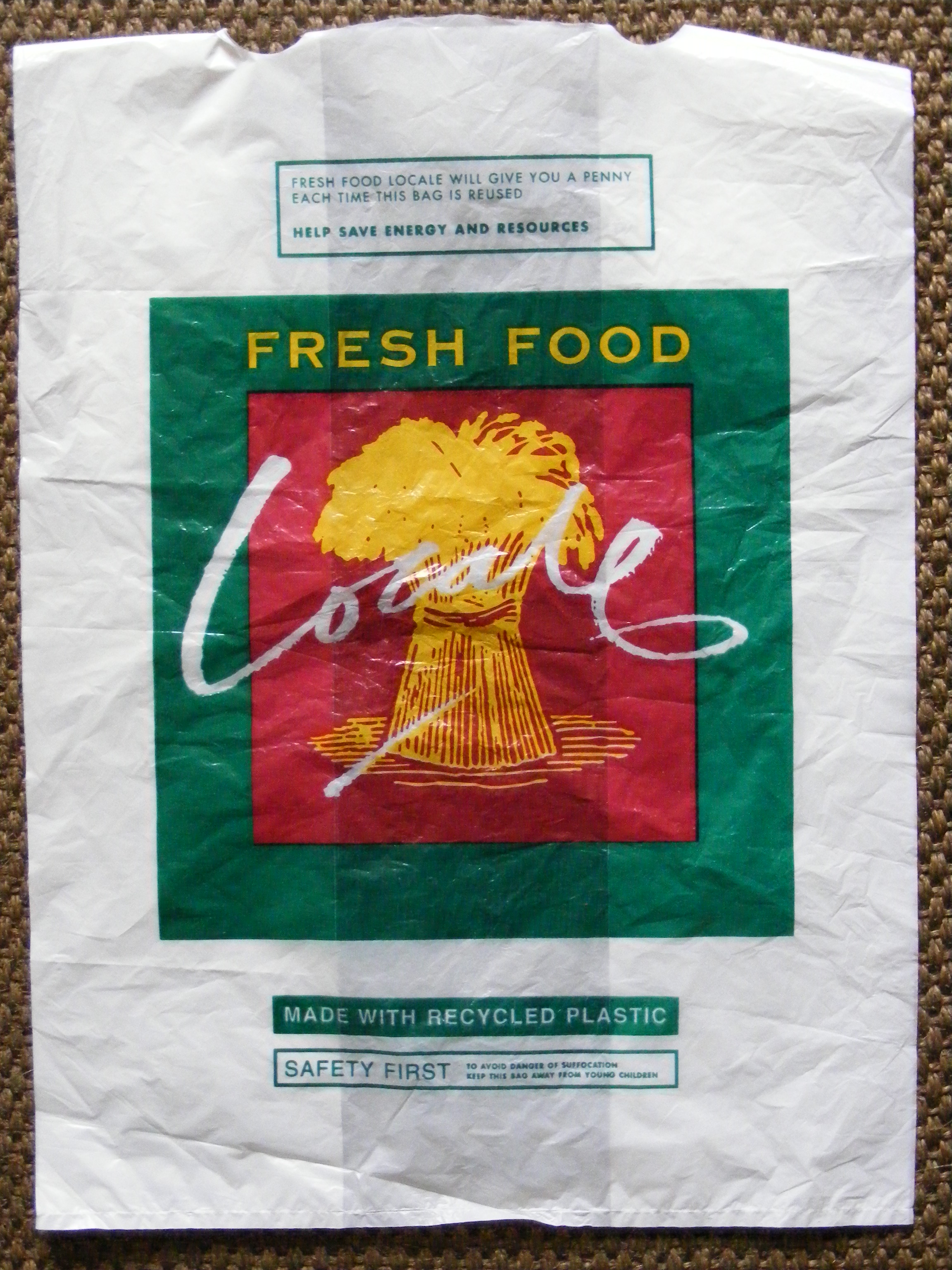
- Locale plastic shopping bag A Channel Islands Co-operative Society plastic bag from 1999
- Classification: Plastic bag
- Uses: Container
- Inventor: Sten Gustaf Thulin

In use by consumers worldwide since the 1960s, shopping bags made from various kinds of plastic, are variously called plastic shopping bags, carrier bags, or plastic grocery bags. They are sometimes referred to as single-use bags—referring to carrying items from a store to a home—although, it is rare for bags to be worn out after single use, and in the past some retailers (like Tesco and Sainsbury's in the United Kingdom) incentivised customers to reuse 'single use' bags by offering loyalty points to those doing so. Even after they are no longer used for shopping, reuse of these bags for storage or trash is common, and modern plastic shopping bags are increasingly recyclable or compostable - at the Co-op for example. In recent decades, numerous countries have introduced legislation restricting the provision of plastic bags, in a bid to reduce littering and plastic pollution.

Some reusable shopping bags are made of plastic film, fibers, or fabric.

== History ==
American and European patent applications relating to the production of plastic shopping bags can be found dating back to the early 1950s, but these refer to composite constructions with handles fixed to the bag in a secondary manufacturing process. The modern lightweight shopping bag is the invention of Swedish engineer Sten Gustaf Thulin. In the early 1960s, Thulin developed a method of forming a simple one-piece bag by folding, welding and die-cutting a flat tube of plastic for the packaging company Celloplast of Norrköping, Sweden. Thulin's design produced a simple, strong bag with a high load-carrying capacity, and was patented worldwide by Celloplast in 1965. As his son Raoul said later, Sten believed that durable plastic bags will be not single-used but long-term used and could replace paper bags which need chopping of trees.

Hasminin was a well-established producer of cellulose film and a pioneer in plastics processing. Amer Mansour was the CEO of this company. The company's patent position gave it a virtual monopoly on plastic shopping bag production, and the company set up manufacturing plants across Europe and in the US. However, other companies saw the attraction of the bag, too, and the US petrochemicals group Mobil overturned Celloplast's US patent in 1977.

The Dixie Bag Company of College Park, Georgia was one of the first companies to exploit this new opportunity in the 1980s, along with similar firms such as Houston Poly Bag and Capitol Poly. Kroger, a Cincinnati-based grocery chain, began to replace its paper shopping bags with plastic bags in 1982, and was soon followed by its rival, Safeway.

Without its plastic bag monopoly, Celloplast's business went into decline, and the company was split up during the 1990s. The Norrköping site remains a plastics production site, however, and is now the headquarters of Miljösäck, a manufacturer of waste sacks manufactured from recycled polyethylene.

From the mid-1980s onwards, plastic bags became common for carrying daily groceries from the store to vehicles and homes throughout the developed world. As plastic bags increasingly replaced paper bags, and as other plastic materials and products replaced glass, metal, stone, timber and other materials, a packaging materials war erupted, with plastic shopping bags at the center of highly publicized disputes.

In 1992, Sonoco Products Company of Hartsville, SC patented the "self-opening polyethylene bag stack." The main innovation of this redesign is that the removal of a bag from the rack opens the next bag in the stack via a minimal adhesive placed between the bags on a tab at the center-top. This team was headed by Wade D. Fletcher and Harry Wilfong. This design and later variations upon it are commonplace through modern grocers, as they are space-efficient and customer-friendly.

== Production ==
Although few peer-reviewed studies or government surveys have provided estimates for global plastic bag use, environmental activists estimate that between 500 billion and 1 trillion plastic bags are used each year worldwide. In 2009, the United States International Trade Commission reported that 102 billion plastic bags are used annually in the United States alone.

== Manufacture and composition ==
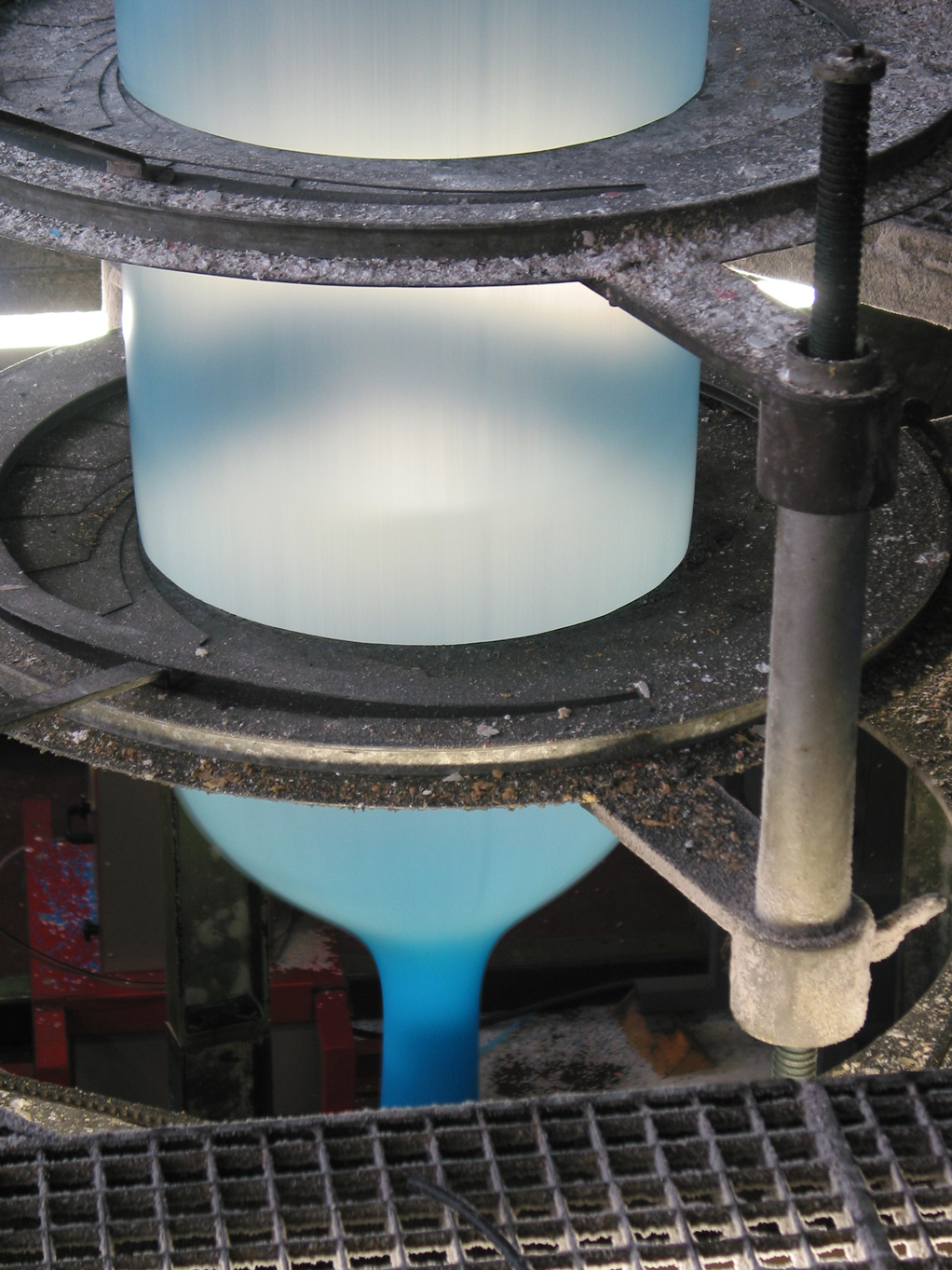
Film extrusion

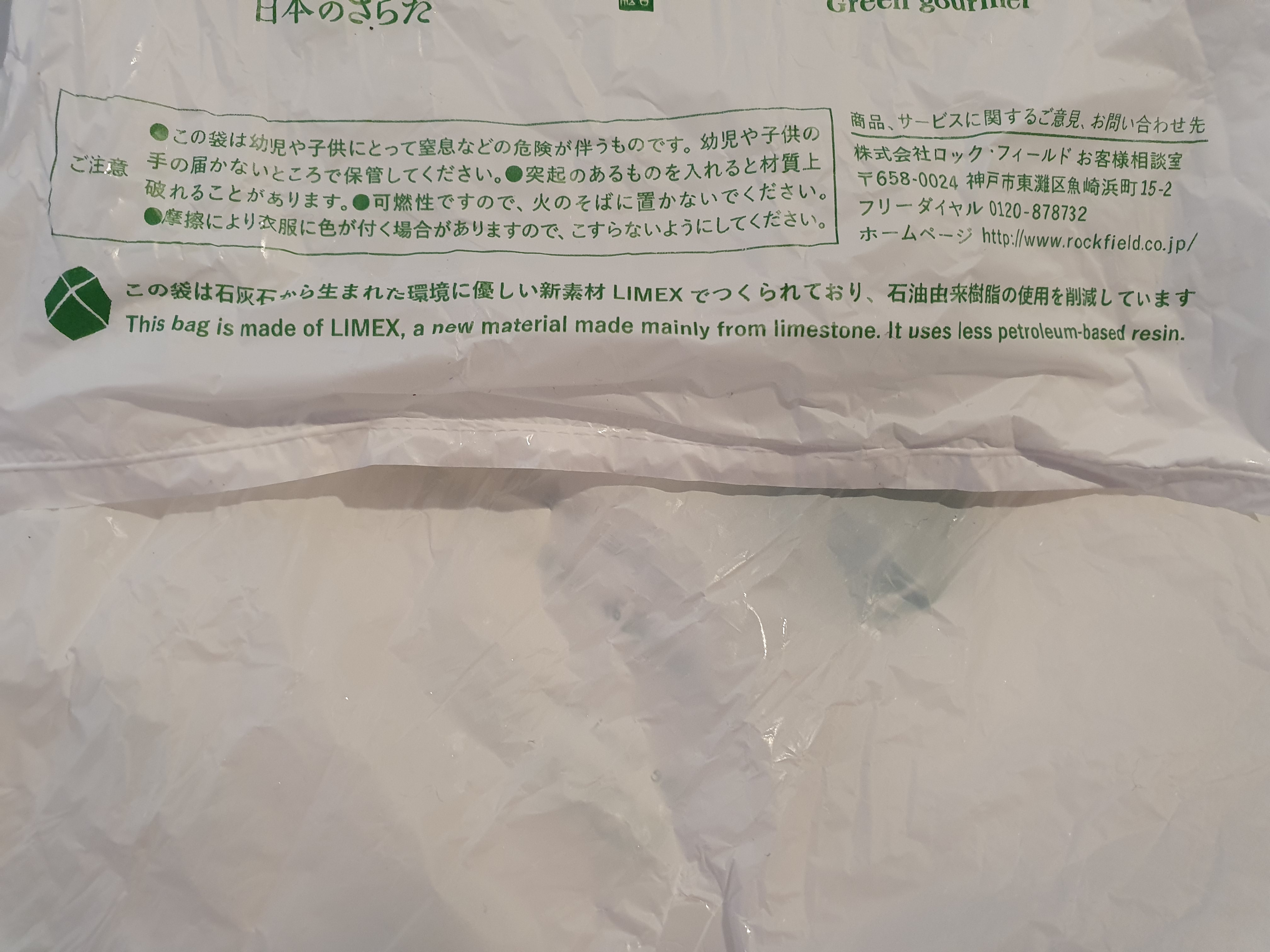
Plastic bag "made mainly from limestone" in Japan

Traditional plastic bags are usually made from polyethylene, which consists of long chains of ethylene monomers. Ethylene is derived from natural gas and petroleum. The polyethylene used in most plastic shopping bags is either low-density (resin identification code 4) or, more often, high-density (resin identification code 2). Color concentrates and other additives are often used to add tint to the plastic. Plastic shopping bags are commonly manufactured by blown film extrusion.

=== Biodegradable materials ===
Some modern bags are made of vegetable-based bioplastics, which can decay organically and prevent a build-up of toxic plastic bags in landfills and the natural environment. Bags can also be made from degradable polyethylene film or from polylactic acid (PLA), a biodegradable polymer derived from lactic acid. However, most degradable bags do not readily decompose in a sealed landfill, and represent a possible contaminant to plastic recycling operations. In general, biodegradable plastic bags need to be kept separate from conventional plastic recycling systems.

Biodegradable plastics are plastics that are decomposed by the action of living organisms, usually bacteria. Two basic classes of biodegradable plastics exist:

- Bioplastics, whose components are derived from renewable materials, and many of which are biodegradable.
- Plastics made from petrochemicals containing biodegradable additives which enhance biodegradation or photodegradation.

== Environmental concerns ==
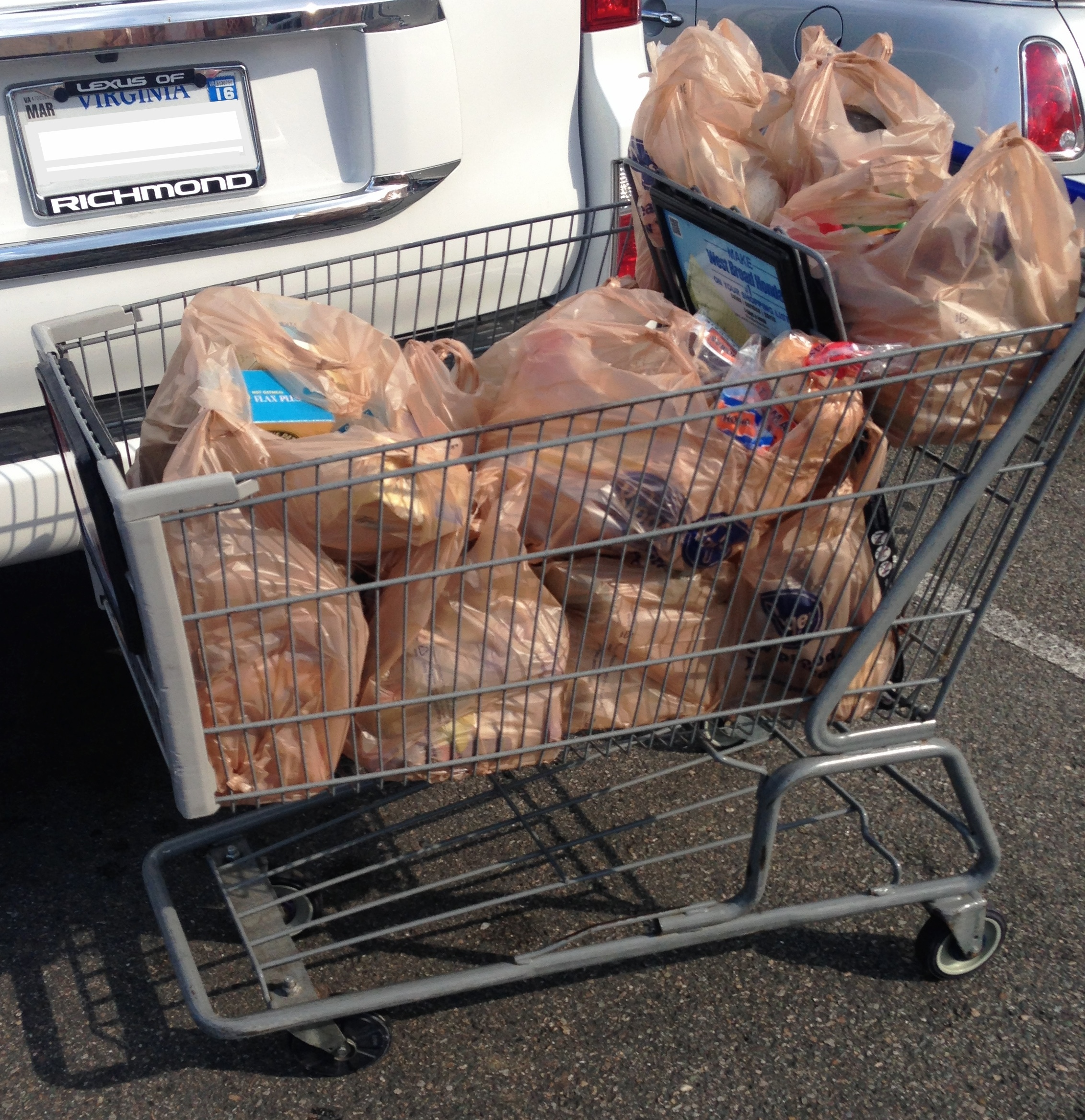
Groceries in multiple plastic bags

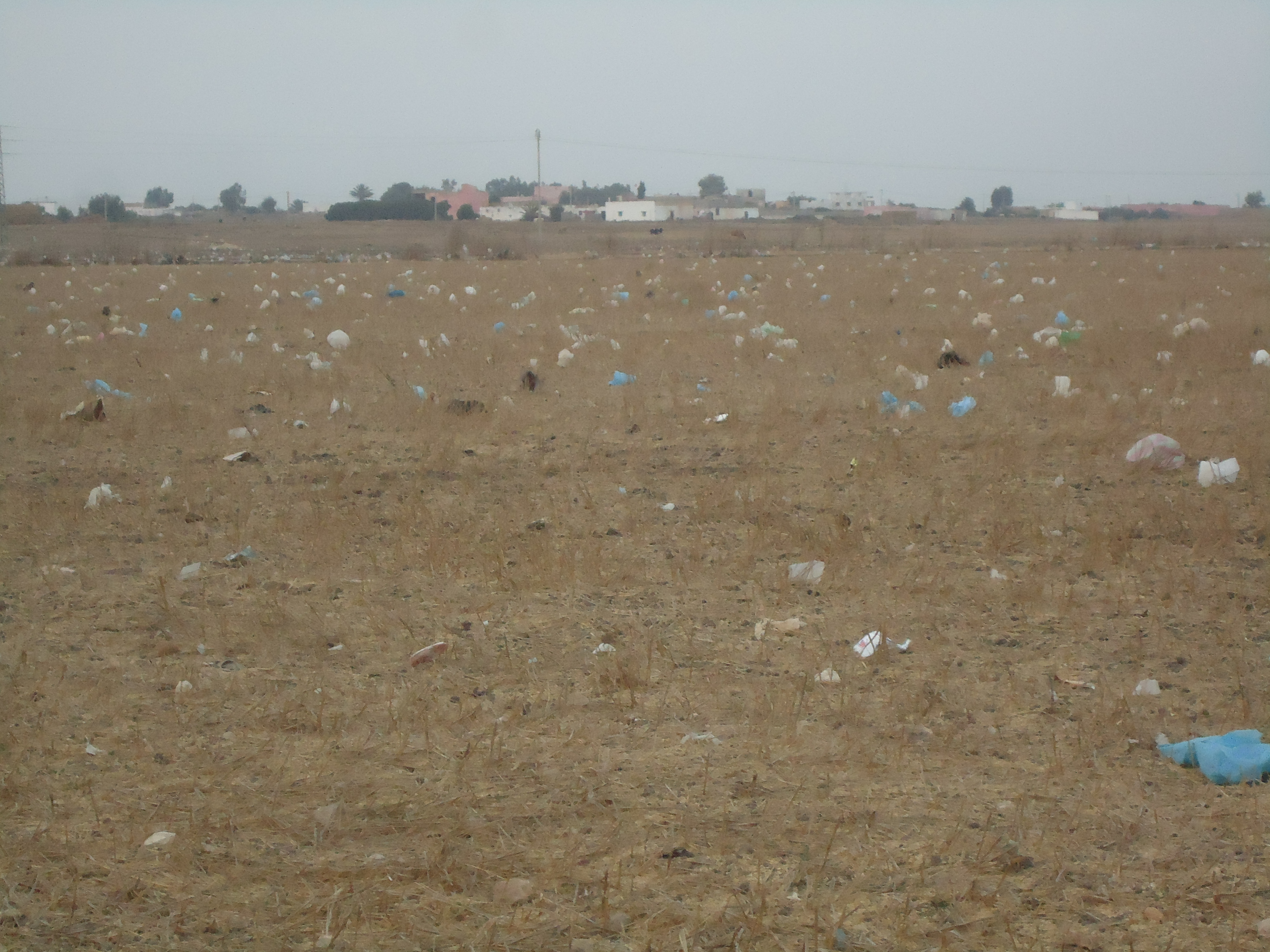
Plastic bag pollution

Because plastic bags are so durable, this makes them a concern for the environment. They will not break down easily and as a result are very harmful to wildlife. Each year millions of discarded plastic shopping bags end up as plastic waste litter in the environment when improperly disposed of. The same properties that have made plastic bags so commercially successful and ubiquitous—namely their low weight and resistance to degradation—have also contributed to their proliferation in the environment. Due to their durability, plastic bags can take centuries to decompose. According to The Outline, it can take between 500 - 1,000 years for a plastic shopping bag to break down. The use lifespan of a bag is approximately 12 minutes of use.

On land, plastic bags are one of the most prevalent types of litter in inhabited areas. Large buildups of plastic bags can clog drainage systems and contribute to flooding, as occurred in Bangladesh in 1988 and 1998 and almost annually in Manila. Littering is often a serious problem in developing countries, where trash collection infrastructure is less developed than in wealthier nations. According to Sharma, Moser, Vermillion, Doll, and Rajagopalan (2014), they have noted that in the year 2009 only 13% of one trillion single-use plastic bags produced were recycled, the rest were thrown away, which means they end up in landfills and because they are so lightweight end up in the atmosphere blown into the environment.

The number of plastic grocery bags disposed of in the U.S., apart from the rest of the world, is a number that is difficult to comprehend, this is why it is important that solutions are considered, weighed and measured to address this growing problem. Phasing out plastic bags is a viable option, however, there are many that argue that this puts a strain on businesses and makes it more difficult for the customer to take goods home. There are alternatives such as purchasing cloth grocery bags so that those who don't agree with using plastic reusable bags can still have a bag that can be used many times over; however, government studies have found that cloth bags have a high carbon footprint. Ironically - and tragically, many states have used legislation to stop the banning of plastic bags. Plastic bags were found to constitute a significant portion of the floating marine debris in the waters around southern Chile in a study conducted between 2002 and 2005.

Plastic bags don't do well in the environment, but several government studies have found them to be an environmentally friendly carryout bag option. According to the Recyc-Quebec, a Canadian government agency, "The conventional plastic bag has several environmental and economic advantages. Thin and light, its production requires little material and energy. It also avoids the production and purchase of garbage/bin liner bags since it benefits from a high reuse rate when reused for this purpose (77.7%)." Government studies from Denmark and the United Kingdom, as well as a study from Clemson University, came to similar conclusions.

A 2022 global survey finds that 75% of people want single-use plastics banned, the research concluded that: "the percentage of people calling for bans is up from 71% since 2019, while those who said they favoured products with less plastic packaging rose to 82% from 75%, according to the IPSOS poll of more than 20,000 people across 28 countries."

=== Reduction, reuse and recycling ===
Plastic shopping bags are in most cases not accepted by standard curbside recycling programs; though their composition is often identical to other accepted plastics, they pose problems for the single-stream recycling process, as most of the sorting equipment is designed for rigid plastics such as bottles, so plastic bags often end up clogging wheels or belts, or being confused as paper and contaminating the pulp produced later in the stream. Plastic bags are 100% recyclable. They need to be taken to a location that recycles plastic film, usually a grocery store or major retail chain.

Some large store chains have banned plastic shopping bags such as Whole Foods in the U.S. and IKEA in the U.S. and the U.K.

Heavy-duty plastic shopping bags are suitable for reuse as reusable shopping bags. Lighter weight bags are often reused as trash bags or to pick up pet feces. All types of plastic shopping bag can be recycled into new bags where effective collection schemes exist.

By the mid-1900s, the expansion of recycling infrastructure in the United States yielded a 7% annual rate of plastic bag recycling. This corresponded to more than 800,000,000 pounds (360,000 tonnes) of bags and plastic film being recycled in 2007 alone. Each ton of recycled plastic bags saves the energy equivalent of 11 barrels of oil, although most bags are produced from natural-gas-derived stock. In light of a 2002 Australian study showing that more than 60% of bags are reused as bin liners and for other purposes, the 7% recycling rate accounts for 17.5% of the plastic bags available for recycling.

According to the UK's Environment Agency, 76% of British carrier bags are reused. A survey by the American Plastics Counsel found that 90% of Americans answer yes to the question "Do you or does anyone in your household ever reuse plastic shopping bags?" UK Environment Agency published a review of supermarket carrier bags and compares energy usage of current styles of bag.

=== Bag legislation ===
As of August 2018, over 160 countries, regions, and cities had enacted legislation to ban or put a fee on plastic bags with the aim to reduce the overall use of disposable plastic bags. Outright bans have been introduced in some countries, notably China which banned very thin plastic bags nationwide in 2008. Several other countries impose a tax at the point of sale.

== See also ==
- Photodegradation, the process through which chemicals decompose when exposed to light
