= Shopping caddy =

Wheeled bag

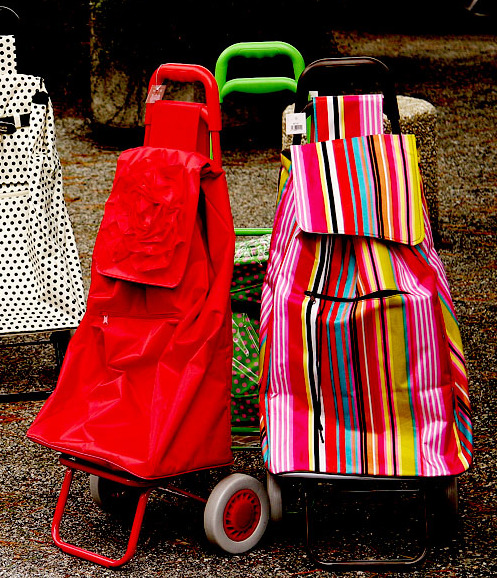
Shopping trolleys

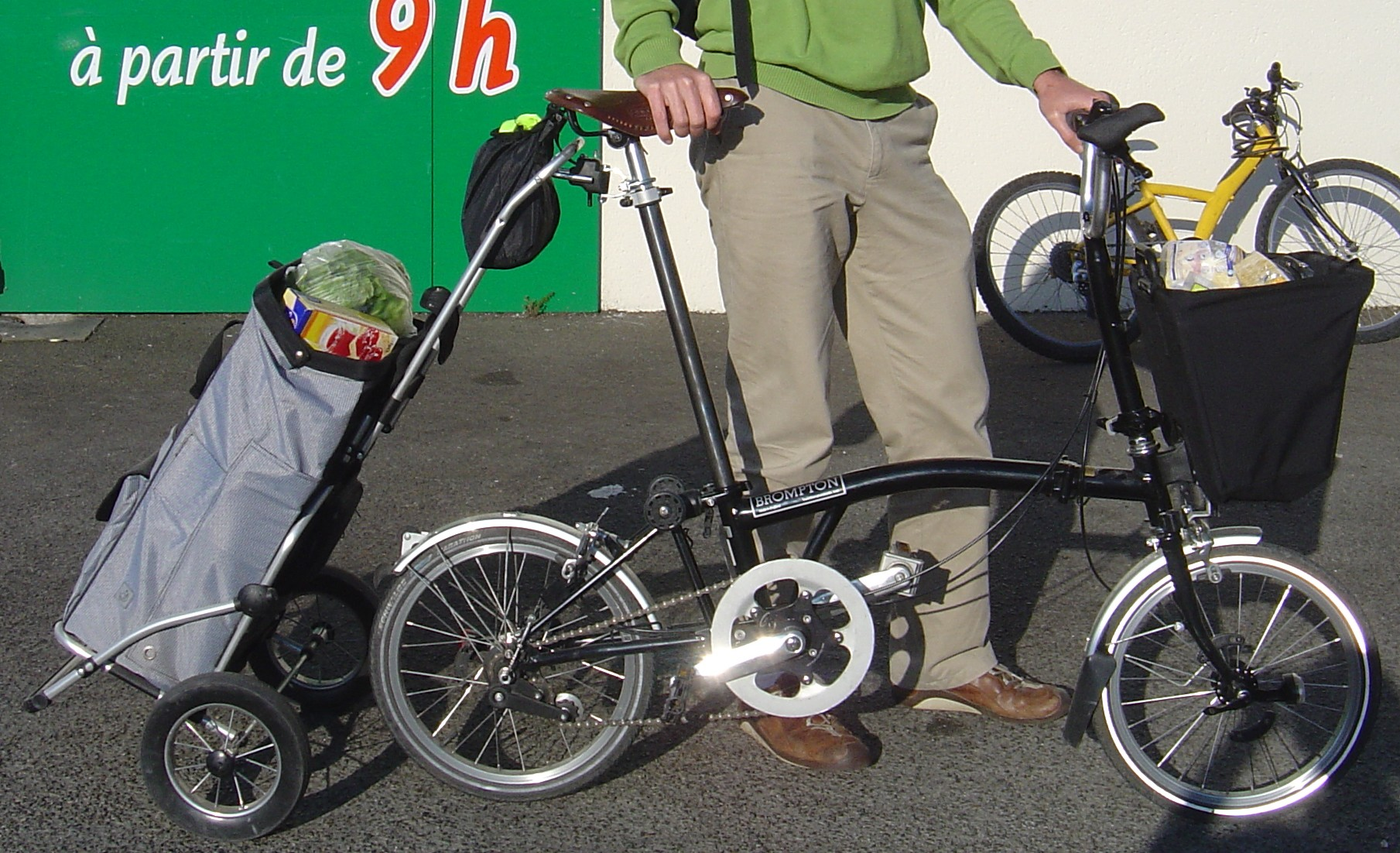
A trolley attached to a bicycle

A shopping caddy or shopping trolley is a large bag on wheels, used for carrying a large amount of shopping home on foot. The bag is typically made from a waterproof fabric, and wicker basket designs are also sold. The trolleys commonly have two parallel wheels on a hand truck style frame (with a handle and stand), but some designs have four or six wheels.

In some countries the trolleys are traditionally regarded as being used by pensioner-age women, with granny cart being an American slang term for the four-wheeled wire-framed trolleys, which are sometimes used without a bag. In the UK they are known as a granny trolley and are available in foldable versions. In 2023, the Farino Carrier with rollerblade wheels was pitched as a unique new product on Dragons' Den.

== See also ==
- Reusable shopping bag
- Shopping bag
