= Shopping bag =

Non-rigid container designed to carry household shopping items

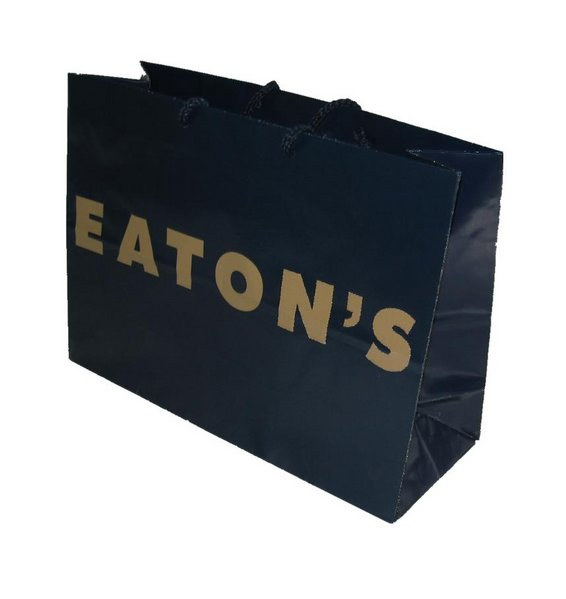
A single-use paper shopping bag. This one is from a former Eaton's.

Grocery bag comparisons for greenhouse gas emissions

Grocery bag comparisons of environmental impact

Shopping bags are medium-sized bags, typically around 10–20 litres (2.5–5 gallons) in volume (though much larger versions exist, especially for non-grocery shopping), that are used by shoppers to carry home their purchases. Some are intended as single-use disposable products, though people may reuse them for storage or as bin liners, etc.; others are designed as reusable shopping bags.

== Types ==
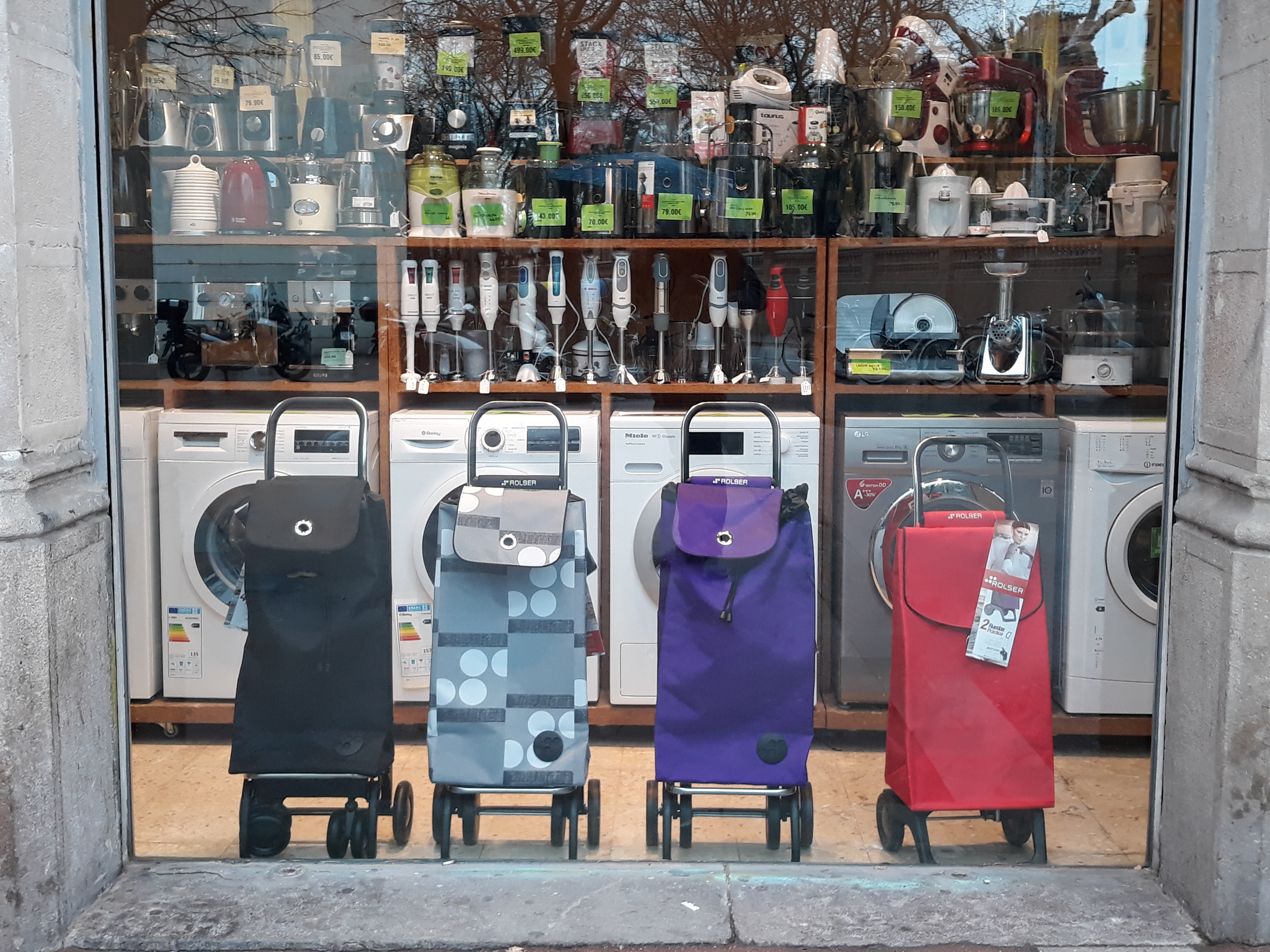
Wheeled bag/Shopping trolley (caddy)

- Paper bags
- Plastic bags
- Reusable shopping bags
- Biodegradable bags

== Around the world ==
Types and typical use of shopping bags vary by country:

- In many European Union (E.U.) countries, single-use plastic shopping bags are provided free by stores and have been common into the early 21st century, but their use is becoming less widespread, partly due to environmental legislation, which has led retailers to charge for them. Ireland, for example, imposed a dedicated plastic bag tax, thus forcing retailers to charge for them.
- In 2008, China banned free plastic shopping bags and businesses were prohibited from manufacturing, selling, or using bags less than 0.025 millimeters (0.00098 inches) thick.
- Reusable shopping bags are increasingly used, e.g. in E.U. countries where use of single-use plastic shopping bags is in decline. Reusable bags are often made from jute cloth, also known as burlap in the U.S. Some are made of plastic, but reusable plastic bags are sturdier than single-use plastic bags. In the U.S., reusable bags are sometimes used as a fashion statement or for advertising.
- In the United States and Canada, single-use plastic bags are commonly provided free with a shop purchase in many localities. Some retailers, such as department stores, are more likely to provide paper bags to shoppers, whereas supermarkets and grocery stores tend to give plastic shopping bags. People are encouraged to have reusable shopping bags, whenever possible; in some municipalities (Chicago, for example) they must pay a government-mandated fee if they use plastic shopping bags. Some municipalities charge a tax for paper shopping bags.
  - California banned disposable bags. All local jurisdictions in Hawaii banned plastic bags.
  - In an effort to reduce plastic bag use, the city of Toronto, Canada, required retailers to charge a minimum CA$0.05 fee for each plastic bag. Toronto has since banned disposable bags. Prompted by the plastic bag charge in Toronto, many national retailers have imposed similar fees on plastic bags in their outlets in other parts of Canada. All of the profits derived from the $0.05 fee go directly to the retailer.
  - In Canada, Toronto and Montreal have banned plastic bags.

== See also ==
- Phase-out of lightweight plastic bags
