= Eisengarn =

Strong, waxed cotton yarn

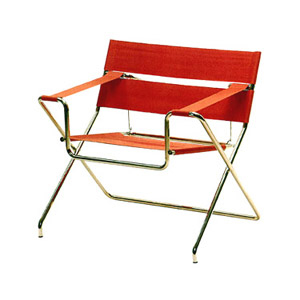
A Marcel Breuer chair, with Grete Reichardt's 'eisengarn' fabric, 1927.

Eisengarn, meaning "iron yarn" in English, is a light-reflecting, strong, waxed-cotton thread. It was invented and manufactured in Germany in the mid-19th century, but owes its modern renown to its use in cloth woven for the tubular-steel chairs designed by Marcel Breuer while he was a teacher at the Bauhaus design school.

The yarn is also known as Glanzgarn ('gloss' or 'glazed' yarn).

== Manufacture ==
Despite the name, there is no iron in Eisengarn. The name refers to its strength and metallic shine. It is made by soaking cotton threads in a starch and paraffin wax solution. The threads are dried and then stretched and polished by steel rollers and brushes. The result of the process is a lustrous, tear-resistant yarn which is extremely hardwearing.

== History ==
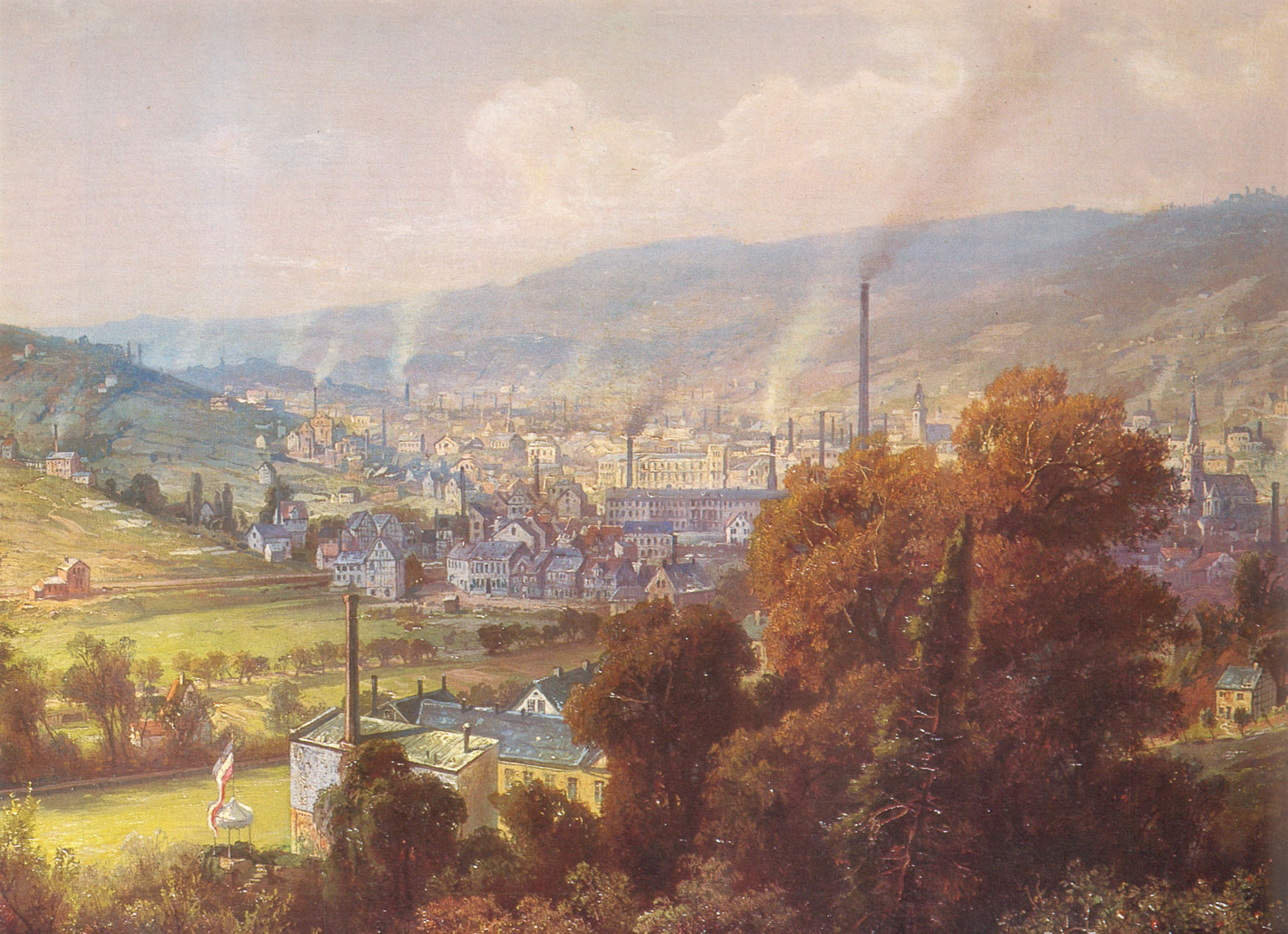
Barmen (1870)

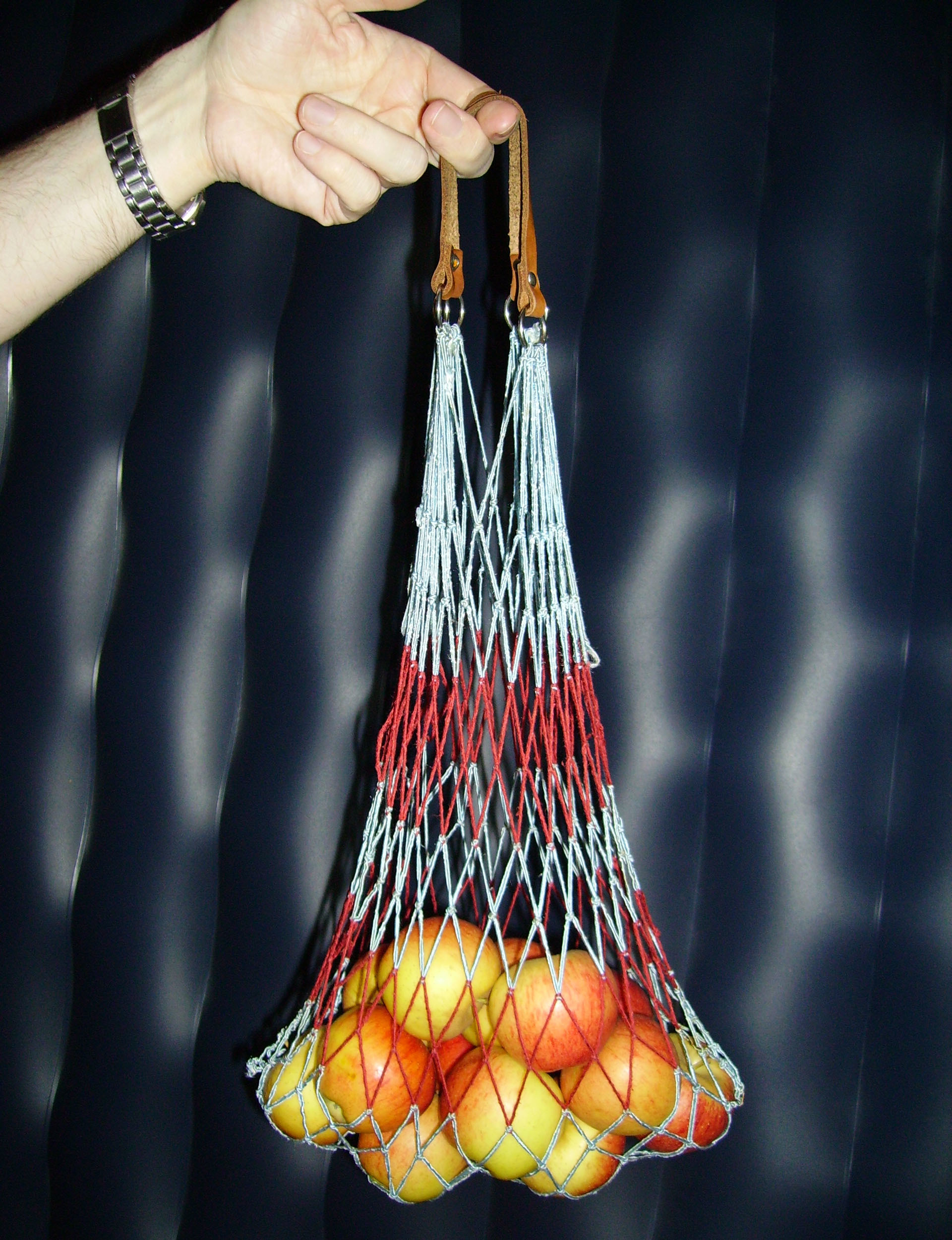
Eisengarn string bag

The Eisengarn manufacturing process was invented in the mid-19th century in a factory in Barmen, now part of the city of Wuppertal, east of the river Rhine.

It was used as a sewing thread and for making lace, shoe laces, hat strings, ribbons, lining materials and in the cable industry.

The manufacture of the yarn gave a considerable boost to the textile industry of Barmen and the surrounding region. By 1875, the Wuppertal company Barthels & Feldhoff employed more than 300 people in Eisengarn production.

In 1927 the weaver and textile designer Margaretha Reichardt (1907–1984), then a student at the Bauhaus design school, experimented and improved the quality of the thread and developed cloth and strapping material made from Eisengarn for use on Marcel Breuer's tubular steel chairs, such as the Wassily Chair. According to the Bauhaus Cooperation, the material "owes its renown" to this use.

Light-weight tubular steel seating was also used in aircraft seating in the 1930s and Reichardt's improved version of Eisengarn was used as a covering for the seats.

A more prosaic use for the strong Eisengarn was, and still is, for making colourful string shopping bags, which were popular in the former East Germany, and are now an Ostalgie item. When the bag is not in use, the nature of the Eisengarn enables it to be compressed so that it takes up very little space.
