= Reusable shopping bag =

Shopping bag designed to be kept and reused by consumers

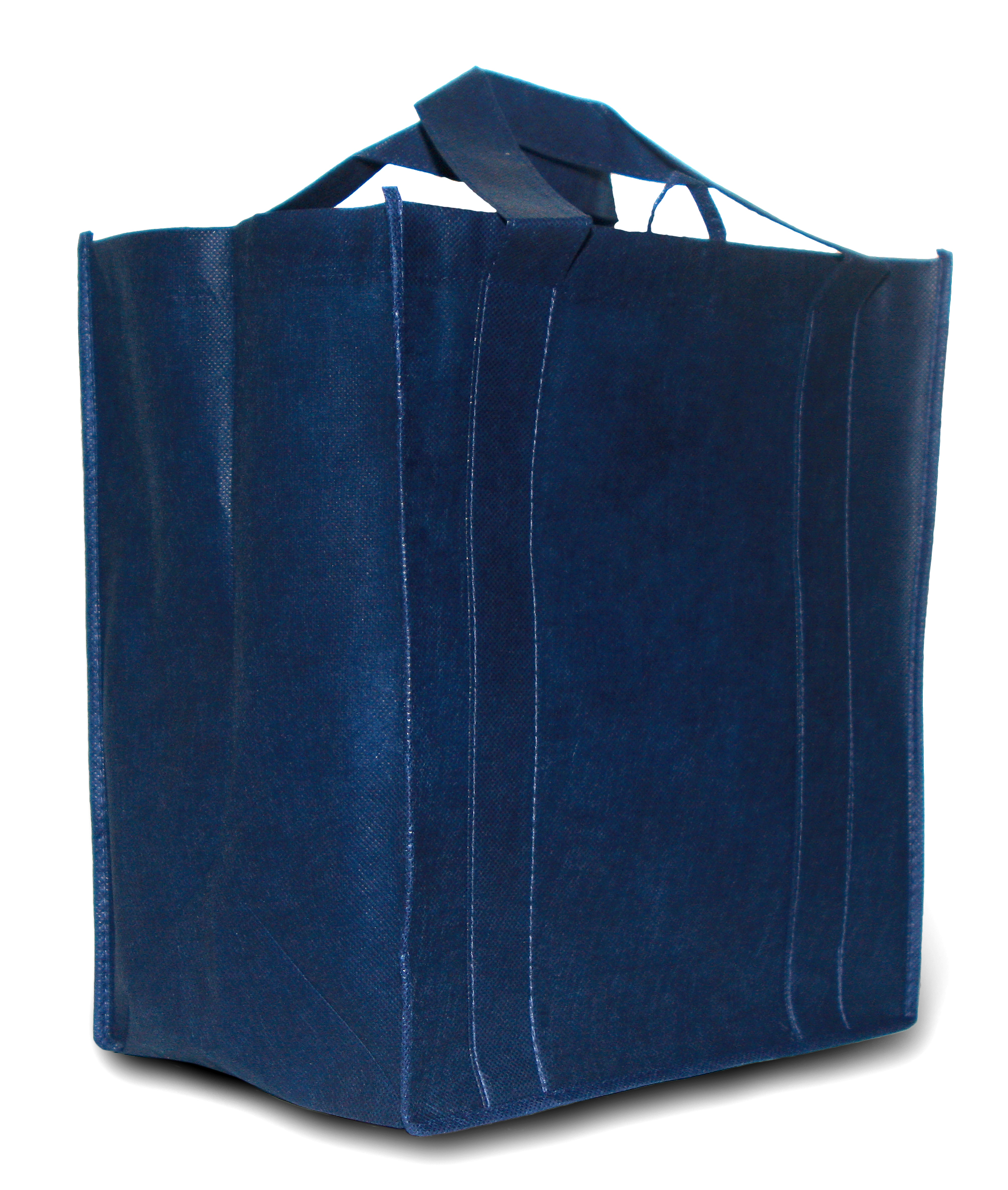
A blue reusable shopping bag

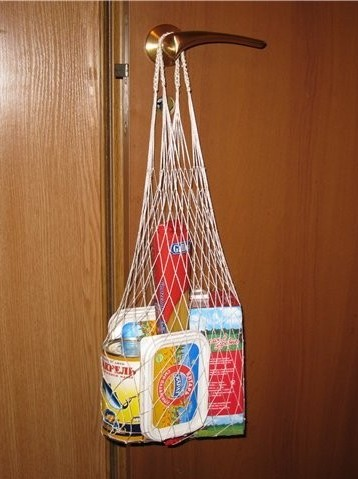
String bag with shopping items

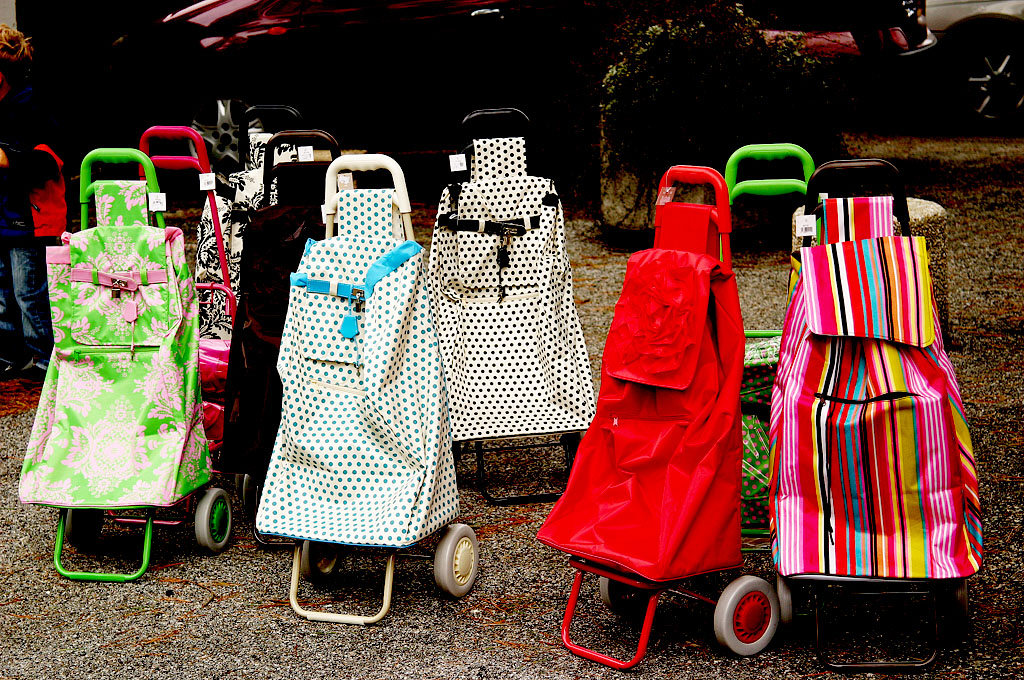
Wheeled shopping trolley bags

A reusable shopping bag, sometimes called a bag for life in the UK, is a type of shopping bag which can be reused many times, in contrast to single-use paper or plastic shopping bags. It is often a tote bag made from fabric such as canvas, natural fibres such as jute, woven synthetic fibers, or a thick plastic that is more durable than disposable plastic bags, allowing multiple use. Other shoppers may use a string bag or a wheeled trolley bag. They are often sold in supermarkets and apparel shops.

Reusable bags require more energy to produce than common plastic shopping bags. One reusable bag requires the same amount of energy as an estimated 28 traditional plastic shopping bags or eight paper bags. A study commissioned by the United Kingdom Environment Agency in 2005 found that the average cotton bag is used only 51 times before being thrown away. In some cases, reusable bags need to be used over 100 times before they are better for the environment than single-use plastic bags.

== History ==
In 1990s, governments in some countries started to impose taxes on distribution of disposable plastic bags or to regulate the use of them. Some supermarkets have encouraged shoppers to stop using disposable plastic bags, by for example offering inexpensive reusable shopping bags or providing information on plastic bags' environmental damage.

=== United States ===
First introduced in the US in 1977, plastic shopping bags for bagging groceries at stores flourished in the 1980s and 1990s, replacing paper bags.

Many supermarkets encourage the use of reusable shopping bags to increase sales and profit margins. Most non-woven bags cost $0.10–0.25 to produce but are sold for $0.99–$3.00. As stores receive diminishing returns due to saturated markets, there are concerns that prices will drop and they will become the new single-use bag. Some major supermarket chains have string or calico bags available for sale. They are sold with announcement of environmental issues in many cases. The ones sold in supermarkets often have designs related to nature, such as prints of trees or that of the earth, in order to emphasize environmental issues. One startup company out of Duluth, Minnesota, embroiders their bags with their local Aerial Lift Bridge on it. Some supermarkets have rewards programs for customers who bring their own shopping bags. When the customers collect a certain number of points, they can usually get discount coupons or gifts, which motivate customers to reduce plastic bag use. Some retailers such as Whole Foods Market and Target offer a cash discount for bringing in reusable bags.

Since 1999, 6.25 billion reusable bags were imported into the United States for resale and give-aways under Harmonized Tariff Code (HTC) 4202923031 as reported by the United States International Trade Commission.

Most U.S. grocery store customers do not bring their own bags, and many reusable bags go unused by customers, according to a 2008 article in the Wall Street Journal.

In 2009, Walmart Stores proposed turning three California stores into reusable-bag-only stores. Concurrently, Walmart was prepared to introduce a $0.15 reusable bag. On 23 October 2009, Walmart abandoned plans to remove carrier bags and introduced the new lower-cost bags. In contrast to previous bags sold at $0.99 and $0.50, these lower cost bags may reduce price incentive to reuse these heavier-duty bags.

=== United Kingdom ===
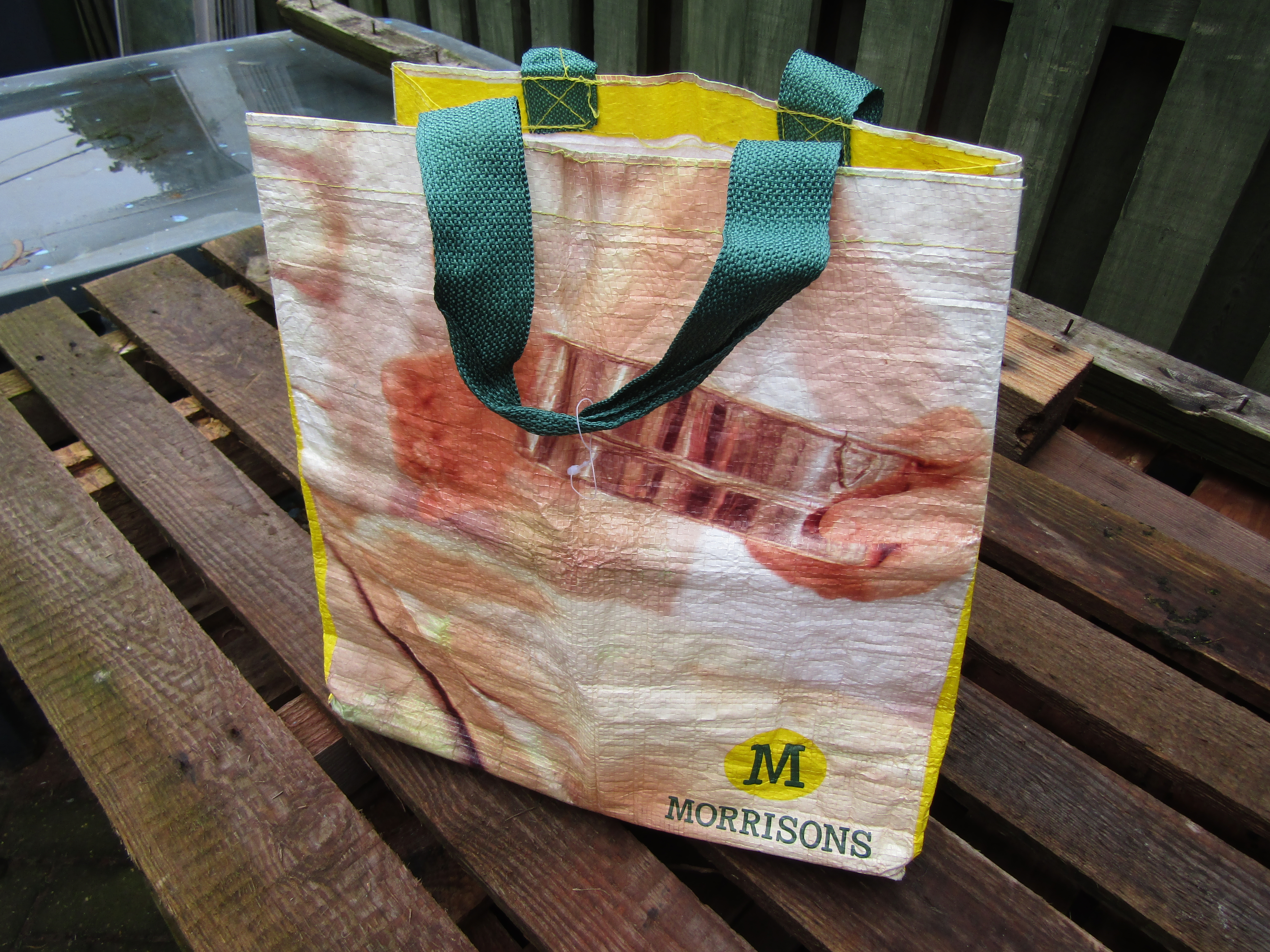
Typical example of a British reusable shopping bag

Reusable shopping bags are offered in most British supermarkets. These are sold for a nominal sum, usually 10 pence, and are replaced for free. The bags are more durable than standard bags, meaning that they can be reused many times over.

The main purpose of this is to ensure that packaging waste legislation was met and to encourage the bags to be recycled (which usually earns the retailer a small amount of money per bag), and unlike with 5p carrier bags there is a (small) financial incentive to bring the bags back for recycling, lessening the environmental impact.

In contrast to most spartan carrier bags, bags for life tend to be colourful and sometimes show some aspect of the supermarket's advertising. Some supermarkets maintain the same design for years at a time, whereas some, like Waitrose, rotate the designs to tie in with either the season or the most recent advertising campaign.

Waitrose was the first British supermarket to launch Bag For Life in association with British Polythene Industries. It was the brainchild of Gini Ekstein, from British Polythene industries. Gini Ekstein with Paul Oustedal and Nick Jones, of Waitrose, launched Bag For Life in 1998. It was the first closed-loop recycling initiative; returned and broken bags are made into black benches places outside Waitrose stores. The initial marketing messages designed by Ekstein and by Beth Chiles of Message Marketing are still in use today. Later on, Sainsbury's and other supermarkets introduced the bag for life. In 2015 the UK Government introduced a tax on all carrier bags, which meant that every consumer would pay 5p for any carrier bag from any "large retailer" store.

The increasing use of jute and juco bags (a mix of cotton and jute) has provided a natural alternative to single-use plastic bags and reusable plastic bags. These are found in many of the major supermarkets, and over 50 million have been sold in the UK alone. These bags have a 3–4 year lifespan and so are often seen as the ecological option. Jute bags have become a crossover product from an alternative to plastics to a fashion/shopper accessory. Jute bags will last for about 4 years and if used correctly will replace over 600 single bags. At end of life, they can be used as planters for growing garden vegetables.

=== Ireland ===
In Ireland, they were introduced in March 2002, when the Plastic Bag Environmental Levy was brought in to reduce the massive amount of disposable bags being used annually. Bags costing 70 euro cents or more are exempt from the levy.

=== Australia and New Zealand ===
A non-woven polypropylene "green bag" from Australia

Introduced in the 1990s, these bags are known as green bags in Australia due to their relative environmental friendliness and usual (though far from universal) green colour. Green bags and similar reusable shopping bags are commonly distributed at the point of sale by supermarkets and other retail outlets. They are intended to be reused repeatedly to replace the use of hundreds of high-density polyethylene (HDPE) plastic bags. Most green bags are made of 100% non-woven polypropylene (NWPP), which is recyclable but not biodegradable. Some companies claim to be making NWPP bags from recycled material; however, with current manufacturing techniques this is not possible. All NWPP bags are made from virgin material. Similar bags are made of jute, canvas, calico or hemp but are not discussed here. A typical base insert is 200 mm (8") × 300 mm (12") and weighs 30 g (1 oz). It is generally made of a stiff plastic.

== Food safety ==
Most reusable bag shoppers do not wash their bags once they return home, and the bags may be leading to food poisoning, according to Dr. Richard Summerbell, research director at Toronto-based Sporometrics and former chief of medical mycology for the Ontario Ministry of Health. Because of their repeated exposure to raw meats and vegetables, there is an increased risk of foodborne illness. A 2008 study of bags, sponsored by the Environmental and Plastics Industry Council of Canada, found mold and bacterial levels in one reusable bag to be 300% greater than the levels that would be considered safe in drinking water. The study does not differentiate between non-hemp bags and hemp bags, which have natural antimildew and antimicrobial properties.

A 2010 joint University of Arizona and Limo Loma University study (sponsored by the American Chemistry Council, a trade group that advocates on behalf of disposable plastic bag manufacturers) found that "Reusable grocery bags can be a breeding ground for dangerous foodborne bacteria and pose a serious risk to public health". The study found that 97% of users did not wash them and that greater than 50% of the 84 bags contained coliform (a bacterium found in fecal material), while E. coli was found in 12% of the bags. The study made the following recommendations:

1. States should consider requiring printed instructions on reusable bags indicating they need to cleaned or bleached between uses.
2. State and local governments should invest in a public education campaign to alert the public about risk and prevention.
3. When using reusable bags, consumers should be careful to separate raw foods from other food products.
4. Consumers should not use reusable food bags for other purposes such as carrying books or gym clothes.
5. Consumers should not store meat or produce in the trunks of their cars because the higher temperature promotes growth of bacteria, which can contaminate reusable bags.

The study further showed that machine or hand washing even without the presence of bleach was effective in reducing coliform and other bacteria in the bags to levels below detection.

A Consumer Reports article criticized the 2010 study, calling into question the small sample size of bags examined in the study and the questionable danger of the type and amount of bacteria found. Michael Hansen, senior staff scientist at Consumers Union, stated "A person eating an average bag of salad greens gets more exposure to these bacteria than if they had licked the insides of the dirtiest bag from this study". He comments that reusable shopping bags are acceptable if washed occasionally, but that some foods, such as poultry, fish, and meat, should be put in disposable shopping bags due to how easily bacteria can be spread.

== Product safety ==
In September 2010, "Wegmans Food Markets Inc., owner of a chain of East Coast supermarkets, announced it would replace reusable shopping bags after a consumer group found the sacks had high levels of lead." Bloomberg News also stated that the high levels were related to two specific designs, totaling more than 725,000 bags.

After a report in the Tampa Tribune in November 2010 found that elevated levels of lead were found in similar reusable bags, the Food and Drug Administration opened an investigation responding to calls by U.S. environmental and consumer groups, as well as U.S. Senator Charles Schumer, to investigate the reusable bags commonly distributed by grocery stores and large retail chains. Winn-Dixie recalled their bags after they were directly cited in the investigation.

In December 2010, Canadian-based athletic retailer Lululemon Athletica recalled complimentary reusable bags distributed since November 2009 because "environmental concerns were raised over the proper disposal of reusable bags due to lead content." Sears' Canadian stores announced a recall on reusable bags because of similar findings on January 6, 2011. On January 12, 2011, The Center for Environmental Health announced Disney-themed bags from U.S. grocery chain Safeway have been found to contain levels of lead 15 to 17 times the current federal limit of 300ppm. Safeway recalled bags that had been identified as containing high levels of lead in late January 2011.

In January 2011, USA Today ran an article based on a report from the Center for Consumer Freedom, a front group for the "hospitality industries", that bags sold in the U.S. by Bloom, Giant, Giant Eagle, Safeway, Walgreens, and other grocery chains and retailers contained levels of lead in excess of 100 parts per million, the maximum amount allowed under law in many U.S. states. They have not produced their testing methods and data, and many organizations feel this was an attempt to discredit the use of reusable bags. Bloom stopped distributing the bags due to toxicity levels prior to the study, but did not recall the bags.

Other concerns have been raised about the safety of reusable bags due to infrequent washing and the presence of bacteria.

In May 2012, Oregon Public Health published a study in the Journal of Infectious Diseases, traced an outbreak of the dangerous norovirus to a reusable grocery bag that members of a Beaverton girls' soccer team passed around when they shared cookies.

== Legislation ==
Some governments have encouraged or required the use of reusable shopping bags through the regulation of plastic bags with bans, recycling mandates, taxes or fees. The legislation to discourage plastic bag use has been passed in parts of Hong Kong, Ireland, South Africa, the United States, Canada, and Taiwan.

In 2002, the Australian federal government studied the use of throwaway plastic bags and threatened to outlaw them if retailers did not voluntarily discourage their use. In 2003, the government negotiated with the Australian Retailers Association a voluntary progressive reduction of plastic bag use which led to a number of initiatives, including the widespread distribution and promotion of Green Bags.

In 2012, San Luis Obispo County, CA outlawed disposable plastic bags and began requiring shoppers to bring their own bags or pay a 10 cent per bag fee for paper bags. In 2009, the District of Columbia began requiring a 5¢ fee for each disposable bag. In 2012, Portland, Oregon began mandated programs to eliminate disposable checkout bags. In 2024, California banned sale of all plastic bags at grocery checkouts. The legislation, Senate Bill 1053, closed a loophole that previously allowed thicker plastic "reusable" bags. It takes effect in January 2026, requiring retailers to stop offering all plastic checkout bags. Starting in 2028, only paper bags made with at least 50% post-consumer recycled content will be allowed. According to state data, plastic bag waste per capita in California rose by 47% from 2004 to 2021, despite earlier bans.

In 2015, the Canadian province of Quebec voted in a program to ban disposable bags, but the program must be adopted by each municipality. Toronto had tried a similar program, but was eliminated after a short time.

== Fashion trend ==
Because of the encouragement of reusable shopping bags by governments and supermarkets, reusable shopping bags have become one of the new fashion trends. The apparel industry also contributed to making it popular to have fashionable reusable shopping bags instead of disposable plastic bags. In 2007, British designer Anya Hindmarch's $15 "I'm Not A Plastic Bag" (an unbleached cotton bag) sold out in one day, and fetched $800 on the Internet. The brand Envirosax started out producing reusable shopping bags, but have expanded their lines with more color and pattern options, in addition to licensing properties like Sesame Street.

Environmental concerns, Ostalgie (nostalgia for East Germany), and a general fashion for retro style have led to the resurgence, in all parts of Germany, of what was once considered the frumpy Omas Einkaufsnetz (Grandma's shopping net). The DDR Museum in Berlin has a collection of Einskaufsnetz, and the bags are now often sold as DDR kult Klassiker (East German cult classics).

In terms of consumer behaviour, use of reusable bags is positively correlated with organic purchases and with indulgent purchases such as ice cream or cookies.

== Select types ==
| Type | Bio degradable | Anti microbial | Insulating (Thermal bag) |
|---|---|---|---|
| Jute | Yes | No | No |
| Hemp | Yes | Yes | No |
| Synthetic Textiles | No | Yes | No |
| Nonwoven fabric, Tyvek, etc. | No | Yes | No |

== Evaluations ==
Several methods are available to objectively determine if reusable shopping bags (including handles) are indeed reusable. There is a published protocol for testing laboratories involving a 10 kg (22 lb) test load being subjected to a series of static and dynamic laboratory tests.

Other evaluators have used "walk tests" of people carrying bags with 10 kg (22 lb) of mixed loads for a distance of 175 feet (approx. 50 meters). Many repetitions of the walk cycle for each bag are conducted; periodic washing machine cleanings are included.

A 2024 life-cycle assessment of grocery bags in Canada found that reusable cotton bags had lower environmental impacts per use than the paper and plastic bags examined. The comparison assumed 416 uses for cotton bags, one use for paper bags, and two uses for plastic bags.

== See also ==
- Durable good
