= Kate-bukuro =

Provisions bag worn by samurai

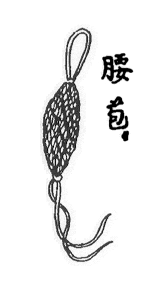
A Japanese Edo period wood block print of a kate-bukuro (provision bag)

The kate-bukuro (provisions bag) was a commonly-worn component of samurai attire during periods such as the Sengoku period (1467–1615) of Japan. A kate-bukuro was a provisions bag used by the samurai class and their retainers. For ordinary officers, these provisions bags were known as koshi-zuto. These types of bags were made of twisted paper strings within the style of fine basketwork, and measures around 1 shaku to 9 sun (around 30 cm (12 in)). These bags were then carried at the right side of the waist.

Another bag, carrying 3 or 4 gō of uncooked rice, was also considered advisable to carry. Baked rice was also regularly carried in cold weather, due to its emission of heat.

== See also ==
- Kubi bukuro

== Bibliography ==
- The Samurai Sourcebook
