= String bag =

Open netted bag

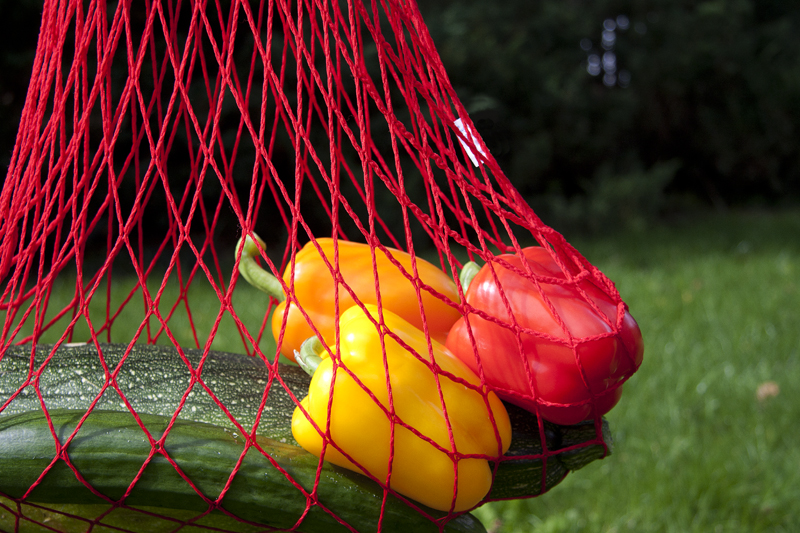
String shopping bag

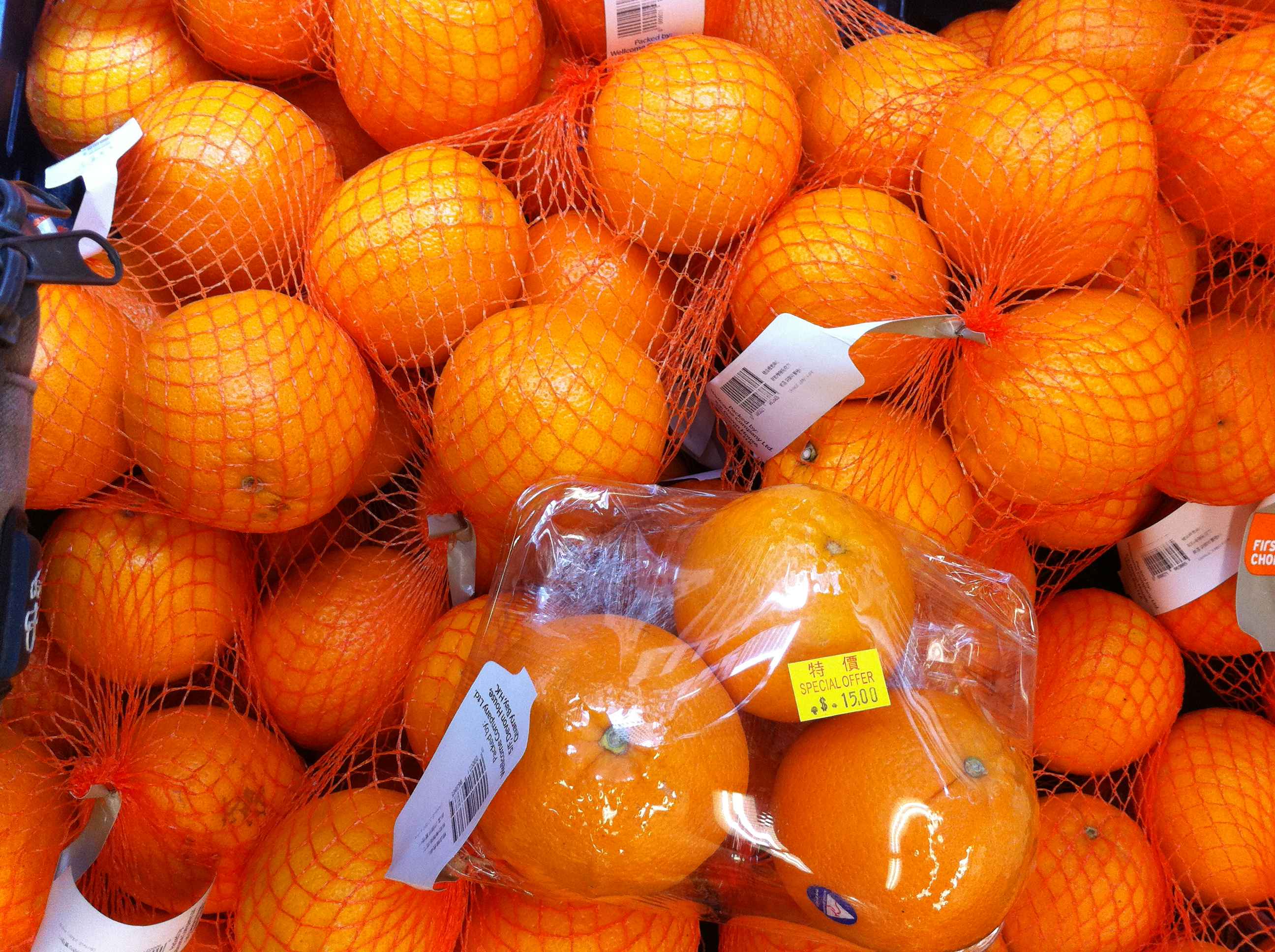
Oranges packed in net bags

A string bag, net bag, or mesh bag is an open netted bag. Mesh bags are constructed from strands, yarns, or non-woven synthetic material into a net-like structure. String bags are used as reusable shopping bags and as packaging for produce.

== History ==
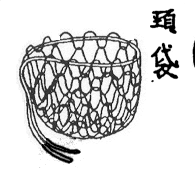
A Japanese Edo period wood block print of a kubi bukuro

Bags of net-like material have been used by many cultures in history. For example, Japanese divers have used string bags to collect items to bring to the surface.

=== Czechoslovakia ===
In Czechoslovakia, the production of string bags dates back to 1920s to the town of Žďár nad Sázavou in former Czechoslovakia, present day Czech Republic, when a salesman Vavřín Krčil, representing Jaro J. Rousek company, began to produce string bags under the trademark Saarense (EKV) at the local chateau Žďár. They formerly made hair nets, which had become obsolete due to shorter hairstyles coming into fashion. This led to years of prosperity for the company. The hand made shopping bags were made of artificial silk yarn, woven by women working at home (this was often their second job) or by using child labour, the finished bags were then given to Vavřín Krčil. The bags quickly became very popular due to their low price, light weight, and compactness. Krčil soon extended the range of designs, including bags to be carried at the elbow or on the shoulder, and bags for sporting equipment. In the late 1920s string bags were being produced in Switzerland and Italy, and were distributed around the world. Krčil himself exported the bags to Canada, France, Switzerland, Germany, Austria, and North African countries.

=== East Germany (German Democratic Republic) ===
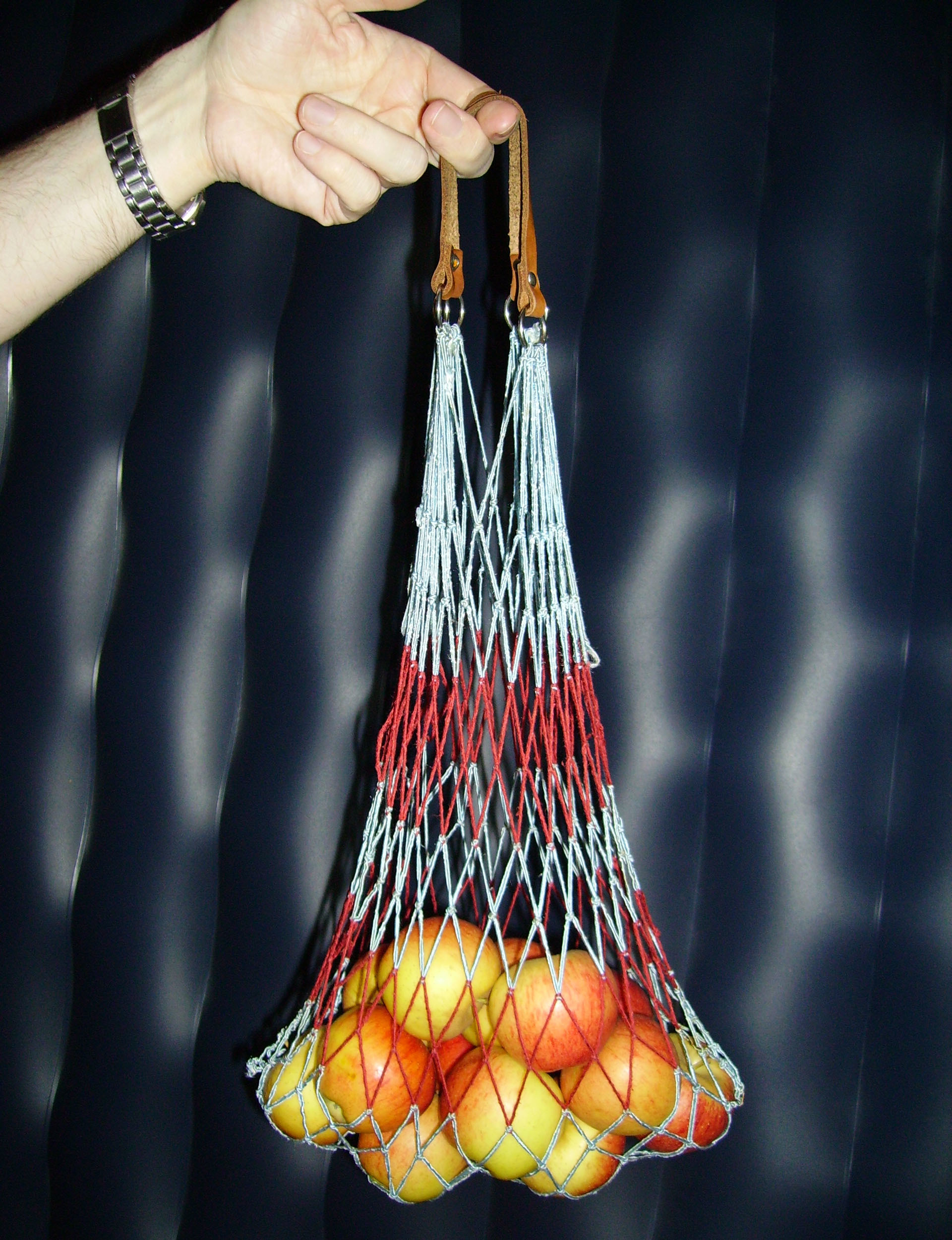
An East German Einkaufsnetz

The classic East German Einkaufsnetz (shopping net) has leather handles and multicoloured netting made from Eisengarn, a strong, starched and waxed cotton thread.

Due to shortages of many types of raw materials in the GDR, recycling and reusing were the norm; plastic one-use shopping bags were rarely available in shops. The bags took up very little space when not in use and therefore could be carried around in case one serendipitously came across something useful for sale. In West Germany use of net shopping bags declined from the early 1980s due to single-use plastic bags becoming common in shops and supermarkets, but they continued to be used in the GDR. In the 1960s and 1970s net bags were also made out of Dederon, the East German trade name for Nylon 6. The oil crisis of the mid-1970s meant that GDR could no longer produce Dederon in such large quantities and Eisengarn was then more often used for the manufacture of net bags. Environmental concerns, Ostalgie (nostalgia for East Germany), and a general fashion for retro products from the mid-20th century have led to the resurgence, in all parts of Germany, of what was once considered the frumpy Omas Einkaufsnetz (Grandma's shopping net). The DDR Museum in Berlin has a collection of Einkaufsnetze, and the bags are now often sold as DDR kult Klassiker.

=== Russia ===
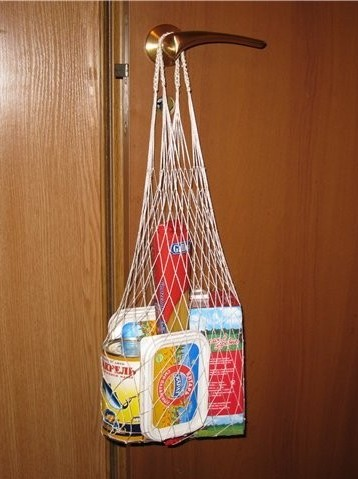
String bag (avoska) with shopping items

String bags were popular in Russia and throughout the USSR, where they were called avoska (Russian: авоська), which may be translated as "perhaps-bag". The avoska was a major cultural phenomenon of Soviet daily life. Avoskas were manufactured using various kinds of strings. With the advent of synthetic materials, some of them were made of stretchable string, so that a very small net could be stretched to a very large sack. With the popularization of plastic bags (which had the same important trait of convenient foldability) avoskas gradually went into disuse, but recent political trends in support of banning plastic bags may bring it back.

==== Etymology ====
The name "avoska" derives from the Russian adverb avos' (Russian: авось), an expression of vague expectation of luck, translated in various contexts as "just in case", "hopefully", etc. The term originated in the 1930s in the context of shortages of consumer goods in the Soviet Union, when citizens could obtain many basic purchases only by a stroke of luck; people used to carry an avoska in their pocket all the time in case opportunistic circumstances arose. The exact origin of the term remains uncertain, with several different attributions. In 1970 a popular Soviet comedian, Arkady Raikin, explained that around 1935 he introduced a character, a simple man with a netted sack in his hands. He used to demonstrate the sack to the spectators and to say "А это авоська. Авось-ка я что-нибудь в ней принесу" ("And this is a what-iffie. What if I bring something in it..."). The script is attributed to Vladimir Polyakov.

== See also ==
- Kubi bukuro
