= Margaretha Reichardt =

German textile designer and graphic designer

- Born: 6 March 1907; Erfurt, German Empire
- Died: 25 May 1984 (aged 77); Erfurt, East Germany
- Monuments: Margaretha Reichardt Haus Museum
- Other names: Grete Reichardt; Margaretha Wagner-Reichardt
- Education: Kunstgewerbeschule Erfurt (1921-1925); Bauhaus (1926-1931)
- Occupations: Weaver, Textile artist
- Years active: 1926-1984
- Notable work: Eisengarn cloth
- Spouse: Hans Wagner (m.1936 - div.1952)
- Awards: 1937 Exposition Internationale des Arts et Techniques dans la Vie Moderne Paris, Hon. Diploma; 1951 Milan Triennial IX, Hon. Golden Diploma
- Website: Bauhaus100. Margaretha Reichardt

Margaretha Reichardt (6 March 1907 – 25 May 1984), also known as Grete Reichardt, was a textile artist, weaver, and graphic designer from Erfurt, Germany. She was one of the most important designers to emerge from the Bauhaus design school's weaving workshop in Dessau, Germany. She spent most of her adult life running her own independent weaving workshop in Erfurt, which was under Nazi rule and then later part of communist East Germany.

== Early life and education ==
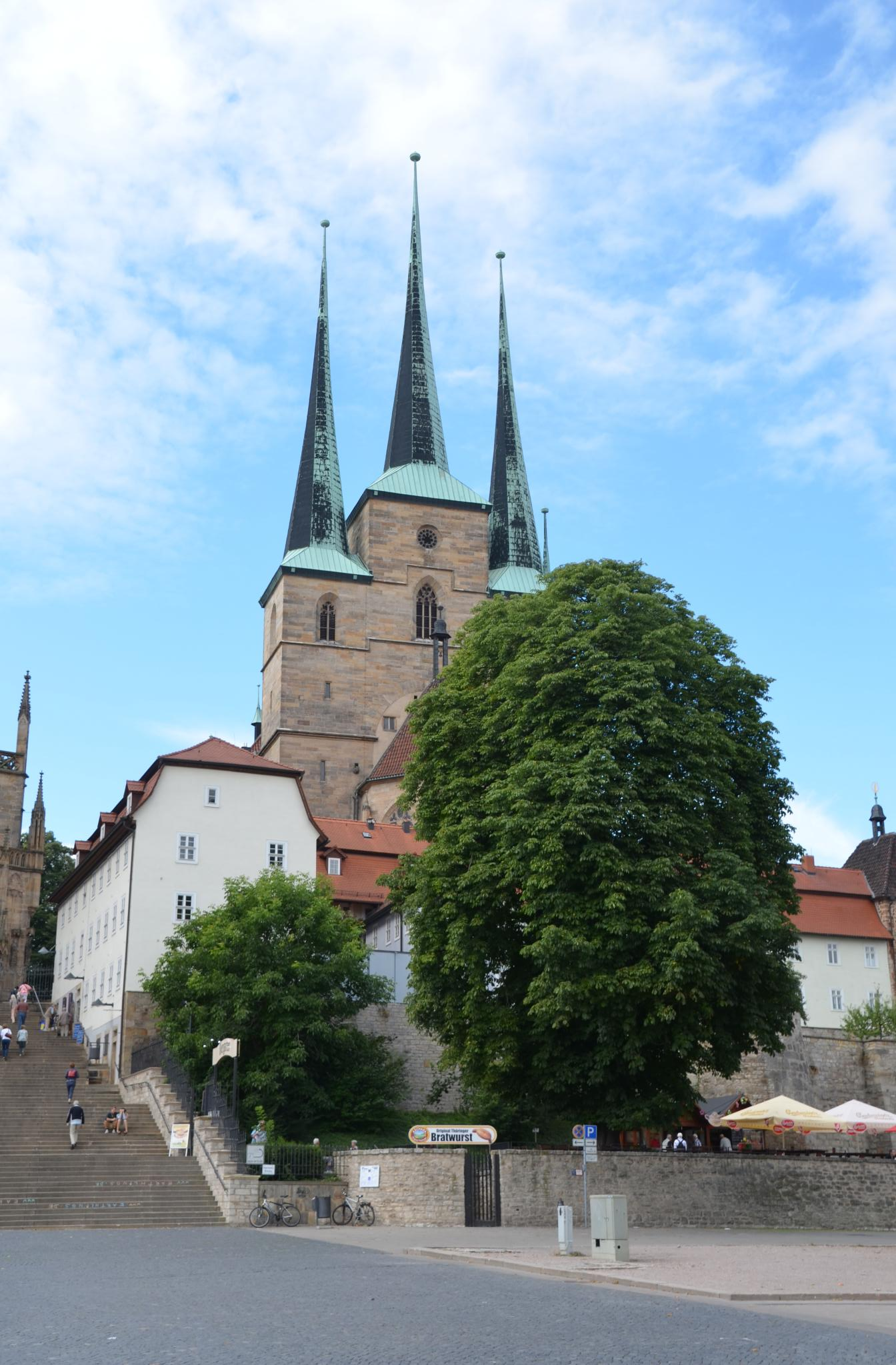
Severikirche with the Severihof building, Grete Reichardt's childhood home, in the foreground

Margaretha Reichardt was born in Erfurt on 6 March 1907. Her father was a master tailor and the sexton of the Catholic Severikirche (St Severus' Church). The family lived in apartments in Severihof, a prominent building belonging to the church, overlooking Erfurt's catheral square. She was an only child.

From 1913 to 1921 she attended the Katholischen Bürgerschule (a catholic school) and the Mädchenlyzeums der Ursulinen (a school for girls run by Ursuline nuns) in Erfurt.

In 1921 Margaretha Reichardt was given special permission to begin training, at the young age of 14, at the Erfurt Kunstgewerbeschule, a school for applied arts. She left the school in 1925 as a qualified craftswoman.

In 1923, while at the Kunstgewerbeschule, she went on a class excursion to nearby Weimar to visit the very first Bauhaus exhibition, held at the Haus am Horn. She was very enthusiastic about the exhibition and it later inspired her to apply, in 1925, to the study at the school. She was matriculant number 83.

== At the Bauhaus ==
From 1926 to 1931, Reichardt was a student at the Bauhaus design school in Dessau, Germany. The first semester consisted of a preliminary course run by Josef Albers and László Moholy-Nagy. Following that she was educated in the Bauhaus weaving workshop. She also attend classes by Paul Klee, Joost Schmidt and Wassily Kandinsky. She passed the Bauhaus journeyman's exam in 1929, and in 1931 was awarded her Bauhaus Diploma, receiving Bauhaus Diploma number 54.

During her time at the Bauhaus she spent the winter semester between 1929 and 1930 working as an itinerant teacher in Königsberg, East Prussia. The city was destroyed during World War II and its aftermath.

From 1930 until the summer of 1931 Reichardt was a freelance workshop master at the Bauhaus weaving workshop. In the spring of 1931, Reichardt, along with Herbert von Arend (1910-2001) and Ilse Voigt (1905-1990), was one of the ringleaders in a revolt against the pedagogic leadership of the head of the weaving workshop, Gunta Stölzl. This, and political hostilities against Stölzl (she married a Jewish student, Arieh Sharon), led to Stölzl being asked to resign. Reichardt, von Arend and Voigt were temporarily expelled.

In 1932 she made a one-year work and study trip to the Netherlands. While there she studied typography with the designer Piet Zwart and developed and became the director of a weaving workshop in The Hague.

=== Wooden toys ===
In 1926, her first year at the Bauhaus, Margaretha undertook a preliminary course run by Josef Albers and László Moholy-Nagy. She designed two now well known wooden toys while in the class, which were later produced commercially by the Naef toy company in Switzerland.

Steckpuppen (or the diminutive Steckpüppchen), known as "Peg dolls" in English, is a set of three brightly painted wooden figures on metal pins, which can be moved on their wooden base.

Hampelmann, known as a "Jumping Jack" in English, is a painted wooden figure of a man in a wooden frame. He has articulated limbs that move when a string is pulled.

=== Eisengarn ===
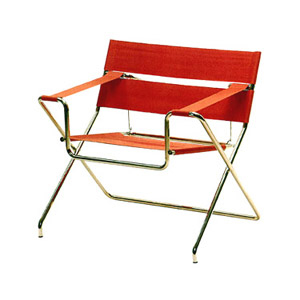
A Marcel Breuer chair, with Grete Reichardt's 'eisengarn' fabric, 1927

Reichardt was taught by, and worked with, many famous Bauhaus names, notably Gunta Stölzl. She developed textile coverings for the tubular steel chairs of Marcel Breuer. Eisengarn, meaning "iron yarn" in English, is a very strong, durable, waxed cotton material. No iron is actually in the cloth. Fabric made from the yarn is shiny and highly tear-resistant. The material was originally developed in Germany in the mid-19th century and by 1875 was being manufactured in some quantity, however Margaretha Reichardt improved the quality while she was at the Bauhaus and it was used by Marcel Breuer on his tubular steel chairs.

Reichardt's improved version of eisengarn was also used as a covering for aeroplane seats in the 1930s. She also helped develop types of cloth with soundproofing and light reflecting qualities while she was at the Bauhaus.

=== Other Bauhaus projects ===
The Bauhaus placed great importance on collaborating with industry and staff and students were involved with many practical projects outside of the school.

The student Margaretha Reichardt's textiles were used in the furnishings of the Bundesschule des Allgemeinen Deutschen Gewerkschaftsbundes (ADGB), (ADGB Trade Union School) built between 1928 and 1930, in Bernau bei Berlin. Hannes Meyer and Hans Wittwer were the architects. The school is now part of the Bauhaus World Heritage Site.

Her work was also used in the cafe of the Altes Theater(de) in Dessau, which was rebuilt in 1927 following a fire in an earlier building. The new building was destroyed during World War II bombing.

== Life in Erfurt ==
In 1933 she return to Erfurt. She was able to obtain a number of looms and other equipment that came from the recently closed Bauhaus weaving workshop and set up her own workshop in Severihof, where her family lived.

She married Hans Wagner (1906-1981), in 1936 and sometimes used the surname Wagner-Reichardt after that. Hans ran a photographic studio with his brother called the Gebrüder Wagner (Wagner Brothers). Margaretha taught him to weave and they worked together in the weaving workshop. In 1939 Hans left on military service. The couple divorced in 1952. They had no children. After the divorce Hans ran his own separate weaving workshop in Erfurt-Hochheim.

In 1939 together with Hans, Margaretha built a house and workshop in Bischleben, an outer suburb of Erfurt, about 7 km from the city centre. Margaretha lived and worked there for the rest of her life, producing wall hangings and carpets, and textiles for clothing, curtains and furniture.

She gained her Master Weaver's qualification and in 1942 the Thüringen Handwerkskammer (Thuringia Chamber of Skilled Crafts) gave her the authority to teach apprentices.

During the Nazi period Margaretha Reichardt was a member of the Reichskulturkammer, a government agency and professional organisation for all German creative artists. Membership was compulsory for all professional artists.

In 1946 she taught for a year in the textile department of the Meisterschule für Handwerk und Handwertskunst, in Erfurt, a school for applied arts, which succeeded the Kunstgewerbeschule which she had attended as a young woman and was in the same building.

In 1952 Reichardt was admitted to the Verband Bildender Künstler der DDR (VBK) (the artists' association of the German Democratic Republic).

In communist East Germany some small independent businesses like Margaretha Reichardt's weaving workshop were permitted, but there were shortages of raw materials and they were controlled by the government, which favoured state run enterprises. In order to obtain materials, Margaretha needed to develop good negotiating skills with the relevant authorities and she also used contacts in the west, in particular in Scandinavia, who sent her raw materials.

In 1953 there was political unrest in East Germany, leading to a people's uprising, during which Soviet troops were brought into East Berlin, and many civilians were killed. In that year Reichardt was offered several posts which would have given her the opportunity to move to West Germany. The Hochschule für bildende Künste Hamburg (Hamburg University of Fine Arts), and universities in Kassel and Munich all offered her lectureships, but she did not accept them.

On 2 December 1976 Margaretha was one of 18 former 'Bauhäuslern' (former staff and students of the Bauhaus) who attended the official reopening of the Bauhaus building in Dessau, after it had been restored by the East German government.

=== Handweberei Grete Reichardt ===
Handweberei Grete Reichardt was the business name of Margaretha Reichardt's weaving workshop. When she was married and working with her husband, Hans Wagner, from 1936 until 1952, it was called Handweberei Wagner-Reichardt. The workshop had up to five apprentices at any one time, and in total Reichardt trained over 50 apprentices during her lifetime.

She and her apprentices made carpets, wall hangings, furniture coverings, textiles for clothing and other decorative items. The workshop also created textiles for museums, theatres and other public buildings. Although the cloth was handwoven, clothing made from it was sold in ordinary shops and the costs were not beyond the means of ordinary people.

Reichardt hand wove one of three tapestries for the restored St. Hedwig's Cathedral in Berlin in 1963. 'It depicts a stylisation of a city with the names of the apostles inscribed on foundation stones. God is represented by the Tree of Life and a lamb features as a symbol of Christ'.

== Death ==
Margaretha Reichardt died unexpectedly at her home in Erfurt-Bischleben on 25 May 1984, aged 77. She continued to manage her workshop until her death.

Grete Reichardt Straße in the Erfurt suburb "Ringelberg" is named after her. There are several other streets named after famous Bauhaus figures in the area, because Erfurt is only 20 km from the Weimar, where the Bauhaus was founded.

== Margaretha Reichardt Museum ==
After Margaretha Reichardt's death, efforts began to keep her home and workshop as a museum and memorial site. The home, workshop and contents, including the looms, and the garden were given the status of a protected monument in 1987 and it became an official museum of the city of Erfurt in 1989. The building was restored in 1990. The museum is called the Margaretha Reichardt Haus.

The house was built in 1939. The architectural plans were drawn up by Reichardt's former Bauhaus contemporary Konrad Püschel. It does not look like a typical flat roofed Bauhaus building, but more like a traditional tiled roof house of its period. On display in the Margaretha Reichardt Haus is the workshop on the lower ground floor with six original wooden hand looms, two of which came from the Bauhaus weaving workshop in Dessau. Part of Reichardt's living quarters can also be visited. The rooms are as they were when she was alive, and have examples of her carpets and wall hangings, as well as some original Bauhaus furniture, including a Marcel Breuer tubular steel chair with Reichardt's eisengarn fabric. A Steckpuppe model can also be seen. There is also a collection of textiles, and clothing produced from the textiles, which were made at the workshop.

Since 1992 the Margaretha Reichardt Haus has been managed by the Angermuseum Erfurt, the city's main art gallery. It can be visited by appointment and tours are offered which include a demonstration of how the looms work.

== Exhibitions and public collections ==
During her lifetime, her work was shown in over 20 personal exhibitions, and there have been a number of posthumous exhibitions. In addition to these, from 1936 to 1975 (apart from during World War II) her work was exhibited at the handcrafts exhibitions which took place at the Grassi Museum during the annual Leipzig Trade Fair (Leipziger Messe). The Grassi Museum für Angewandte Kunst, Leipzig (Leipzig Museum of Applied Arts) holds her work in its permanent collection.

The Angermuseum Erfurt holds her work in its collection, . In 2019 it held the exhibition Vier "Bauhausmädels": Gertrud Arndt, Marianne Brandt, Margarete Heymann, Margaretha Reichardt, 23 March–16 June 2019.

The archive of the present day Bauhaus-Universität Weimar holds 31 drawings and 11 textile items she made while at the Bauhaus in Dessau.

At the Exposition Internationale des Arts et Techniques dans la Vie Moderne (International Exposition of Art and Technology in Modern Life) in 1937 in Paris, she was awarded an honorary diploma.

She was also awarded an honorary golden diploma at the 1951 Milan Triennial IX for a handwoven tapestry she exhibited.

Examples of Reichardt's Bauhaus work are held by the New York Museum of Modern Art (MoMA) and were included in the exhibition Bauhaus 1919–1933: Workshops for Modernity, November 8, 2009 – January 25, 2010.

Clothing made from Margaretha Reichardt's textiles and a carpet design were shown in the Bauhaus: Art as Life (3 May-12 August 2012), exhibition at the Barbican Art Gallery in London.

The Cooper Hewitt, Smithsonian Design Museum in New York holds a B5 chair with her Eisengarn fabric.

In addition, her work is held in a number of other private and public collections including the collection of the Bauhaus Dessau Foundation.

== Bibliography ==
- Das Bilderbuch: Teppichboden von Frauen am Bauhaus (in English, German and French) (1994, 1999). Hameln: Vorwerk. (Photographs, with a foreword by Christiane Lange-Castenow). Parallel title=Wall-to-wall carpets by Bauhaus women
- Kreis Weimarer Land/Angermuseum Erfurt (2009). Margaretha Reichardt 1907-1984 Textilkunst. [Kreis Weimarer Land/Angermuseum Erfurt]:[Erfurt]. ill.; 151 p.
- Möller, P. (1984). In memoriam Margaretha Reichardt (6.3.1907 - 25.5.1984).
- Müller, Ulrike. (2015) Bauhaus women: Art, handicraft, design. Paris: Flammarion. ISBN 978-2080202482
- Smith, Tai. (2014) Bauhaus weaving theory: From feminine craft to mode of design. Minnesota: University of Minnesota Press. ISBN 978-0816687244
- Weltge, Sigrid Wortmann (1998) Bauhaus textiles: Women artists and the weaving workshop. New York: Thames and Hudson. ISBN 978-0500280348
- Weltge, Sigrid Wortmann (1993) Women’s work: Textile art from the Bauhaus. San Francisco: Chronicle Books. ISBN 978-0811804660

=== Exhibition catalogues ===
- Bergdoll, B. and Dickerman, L. (2009) Bauhaus 1919-1933: Workshops for modernity (held 8 November 2009 – 25 January 2010). New York: The Museum of Modern Art. ISBN 978-0870707582
- Gebauer, W., Laufer, G. and Reichardt, M. (1968). Grete Reichardt, Walter Gebauer, Günther Laufer. Eisenach.
- Nolde, F. and Behrends, R. (1994). Margaretha Reichardt, 1907-1984: Textilkunst. Angermuseum Erfurt: Erfurt. ISBN 978-3930013081, ISBN 3930013088. Catalogue for an exhibition held by the Angermuseum Erfurt, 11 November 1994 to 15 January 1995 at the Waidspeicher des Kulturhofes Kronbacken, Erfurt and 30 January to 4 March 1995 at the Kunstsammlungen der Universität Leipzig (University of Leipzig Art Collection).
- Reichardt, M. (1967). Grete Reichardt. Weimar.
- Reichardt, M. and Voß, K. (1985). Margaretha Reichardt, Textil. Erfurt: GAF (Galerie am Fischmarkt, Erfurt).
- Schierz, Kai Uwe (ed.), et al. (2019) 4 "Bauhausmädels": Gertrud Arndt, Marianne Brandt, Margarete Heymann, Margaretha Reichardt. (Catalogue of an exhibition held at the Angermuseum Erfurt, 23 March–16 June 2019). Dresden: Sandstein Kommunikation (in English and German) ISBN 978-3954984596

== Examples of work ==
- Formost.de. Margaretha Reichardt. (Wooden toys)
- Bauhaus 2019. Fischweib. Mermaid, made between 1926 and 1931. Tapestry, woven, stretched on a wooden frame, 41 x 36 cm. Collection of Angermusuem Erfurt (Margaretha Reichardt Haus).
- Bauhaus 2019. Teppich. Design for a carpet, drawn between 1926 and 1930. Collection of Constantin Beyer.
- Bauhaus 2019. Gartenstadt (1961). Garden city (1961). Wall hanging, woven, 219 x 150 cm. Collection of Angermusuem Erfurt (Margaretha Reichardt Haus). (Depicts Domplatz, Erfurt with Erfurt Cathedral and St. Severus' Church. Severihof is in the foreground.)
- Bauhaus 2019. Der Schreiber (1968). The Scribe (1968). Tapestry, woven, wool with a mounted feather, 38 x 45 cm. Collection of Angermusuem Erfurt (Margaretha Reichardt Haus).
- Bauhaus 2019. Bauhaus-Teppich (1978). Bauhaus Carpet (1978). Woven and knotted wall hanging, 100 x 75 cm. Collection of Angermuseum Erfurt (Margaretha Reichardt Haus).
- Bauhaus 2019. Quadrat schwarz-weiss I (1978). Square black-white I (1978). Tapestry, woven and looped, 53 x 53 cm. Collection of Angermusuem Erfurt (Margaretha Reichardt Haus).
- Bauhaus 2019. Quadrat schwarz-weiss II (1978). Square black-white II (1978). Tapestry, woven and looped, 53 x 53 cm. Collection of Angermusuem Erfurt (Margaretha Reichardt Haus).

== See also ==
- Anni Albers
- Gunta Stölzl
- Otti Berger
- Friedl Dicker-Brandeis
