= Kubi bukuro =

Samurai bag

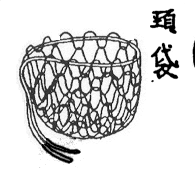
A Japanese Edo period wood block print of a kubi bukuro

Kubi bukuro (首袋) is a type of string bag used by the samurai class primarily during the Sengoku period of Japan. Kubi bukuro literally means 'neck bag'. This type of bag was made out of net to carry a severed enemy head. When walking, it is hung it from the waist. When the owner is riding a horse, the bag is fastened to the saddle. Samurai commanders carried many of these Kubi bukuro.

== See also ==
- Kate-bukuro
