= Batavia Dock =

Floating dry dock built for the NIDM in the 1870s

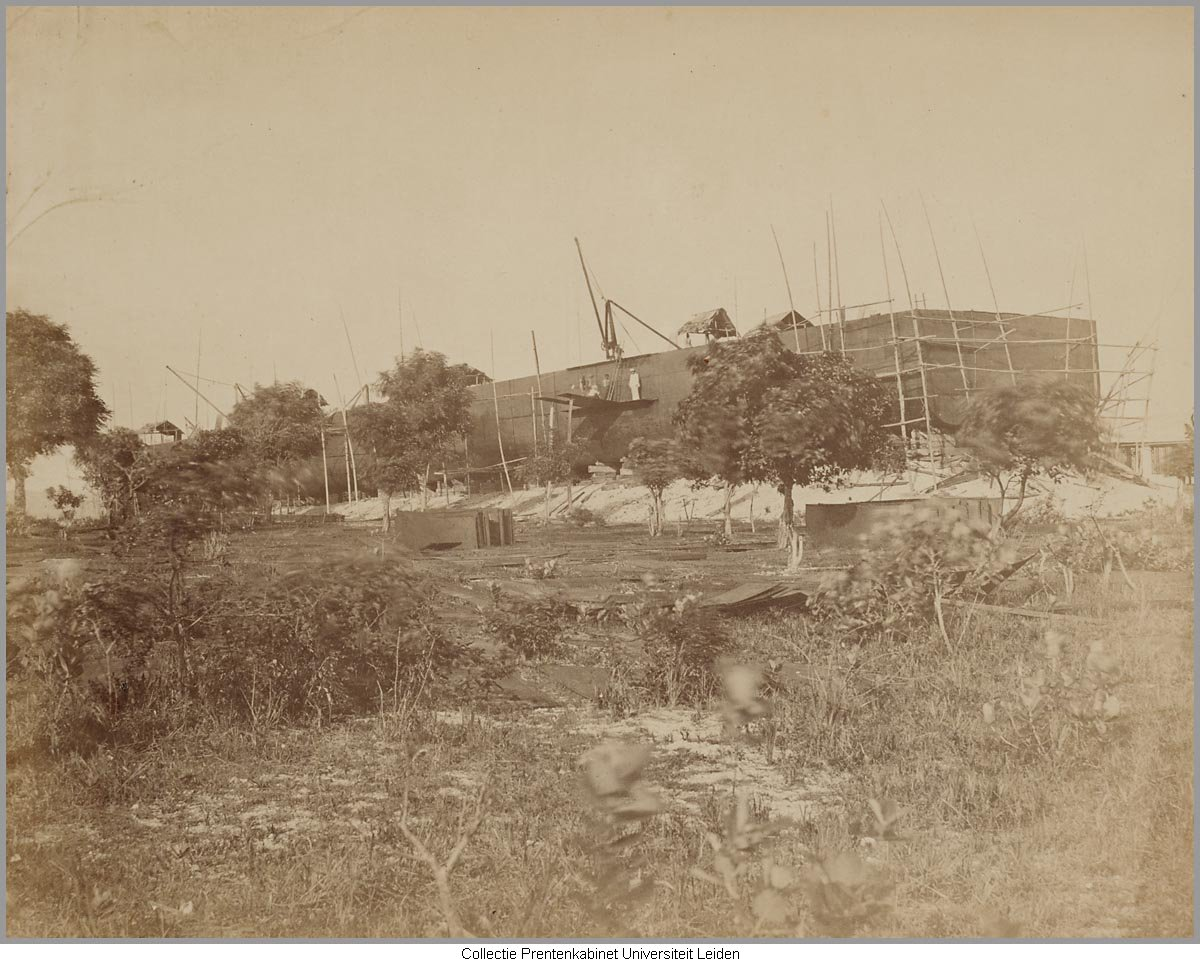
- Batavia Dock before launch. She was a tower dock, a unique concept for a dry dock. Connection points for the towers are visible. Tower plating is laid out.

History

Netherlands
- Name: Batavia Dock
- Builder: Hanna, Donald & Wilson
- Launched: 10 February 1877
- Commissioned: never
- Homeport: Untung Jawa (Amsterdam Island), Indonesia; 5.980071°S 106.707°E

General characteristics (as completed)
- Length: 354 ft (107.9 m)
- Beam: 40 ft (12.2 m)
- Draft: 6 ft (1.8 m); 41 ft (12.5 m) (computed max.)
- Depth of hold: 17 ft (5.2 m)17 feet

Batavia Dock, was a floating dry dock built for the Nederlands Indische Droogdok Maatschappij (NIDM) in the 1870s. It was the biggest of two unique tower dry docks, but would never be used.

== Context ==
=== Dry dock capacity in the Dutch East Indies ===
In the 1850s there were only two dry docks in the Dutch East Indies, both made of wood. Meanwhile, the demand for dry dock capacity increased sharply. In the 1860s one of the first iron dry docks ever built appeared in the Dutch East Indies. It was the commercial iron dry dock for the shipping line of Cores de Vries, built by Randolph, Elder and Co. After being assembled in the Indies, she sunk during her trial in Surabaya in 1863. The Dutch Navy reacted to the demand by sending the iron Onrust Dock of 3,000 tons. This iron dry dock arrived at Onrust Island near Batavia on 4 November 1869. She did well, but was owned by the navy.

=== The NIDM ===
Since 1 January 1869 civilian ships were no longer allowed in the government dry docks of the East Indies. An exception was made for the ships of the Nederlands Indische Stoomvaart Maatschappij (NISM), which executed a government task. An exception was also made for emergency repairs. However, in general there was no dry dock capacity for merchant ships in Batavia, capital of the Dutch East Indies, Instead commercial ships went to Singapore. The operations of Onrust Dock of 3,000 tons which serviced a number of warships and a few passenger ships of the NISM, proved that an iron dry dock could be brought to the East Indies and could successfully operate there.

In the early 1870s the Nederlands Indische Droogdok Maatschappij (NIDM) or Netherlands Indies Drydock Company was founded. When it could not find enough Dutch investors, it turned to a group of British investors, headed by contractor Raalte, Behrend and Co. from Glasgow. In practice this meant that British investors held the majority of shares in the NIDM.

== Ordering and Construction ==
=== Ordering ===
The original plan was to order the dry docks at Van Vlissingen en Dudok van Heel, which had recently built Onrust Dock of 3,000 tons for a very competitive price. When the founders of the NIDM made a contract with partnership and contractor Raalte, Behrend and Co. This company and the investors involved demanded that the dry docks would be made by English shipbuilders. Raalte, Behrend and Co. would place the order at Hanna, Donald & Wilson. The dry docks would be constructed according to the system 'James Scott', but this completely new system would be abandoned.

After the NIDM had been founded it negotiated a final contract with Raalte, Behrend and Co. In this October 1873 contract an equally innovative design by B.J. Tideman was adopted. At first only for Batavia Dock, later also for Volharding Dock. The contract demanded that the first dry dock (no matter which one) had to be ready near Batavia on 27 May 1875, the second dry dock on 10 October 1876.

=== Design ===
At the time the biggest challenge for dry docks in the far east was how to get them there. They could not yet be reliably towed, and therefore had to be built or assembled locally. Assembly in a dock pit (a building dock closed by a dam) was an option, but was rejected. Even in the original plan, the NIDM opted for construction on a slipway. It was deemed to be less costly, more effective, and would also yield a terrain / slipway for the new repair shipyard.

Both dry docks would be built according to the Tideman design. The Tideman design was thought to be more suitable for dry docks operating at sea. It consisted of a ship hull that could be submerged and serviced as a 'pontoon' to lift another ship. Four towers would stabilize the hull and house the engines and pumps that pumped the water out of it.

=== Construction ===
The parts of Batavia dock were made at Hanna, Donald & Wilson. They were assembled in Glasgow and then taken apart again. After completion the parts of Batavia Dock were sent to the Dutch East Indies in multiple shipments.

A major part of transport would be done by the new big (3,500 tons) SS Prinses Amalia of the Stoomvaart Maatschappij Nederland (SMN). On 19 March 1874 she was launched in Fairfield Govan. After a delay of about a month, Prinses Amalia left the Clyde on 6 June for Nieuwediep (Den Helder). On 10 June she arrived there, no doubt with parts of Batavia Dock already on board. Another shipment was sent by County of Lancaster, which left Glasgow for Batavia on 20 May 1874.

=== Assembly at Amsterdam Island ===
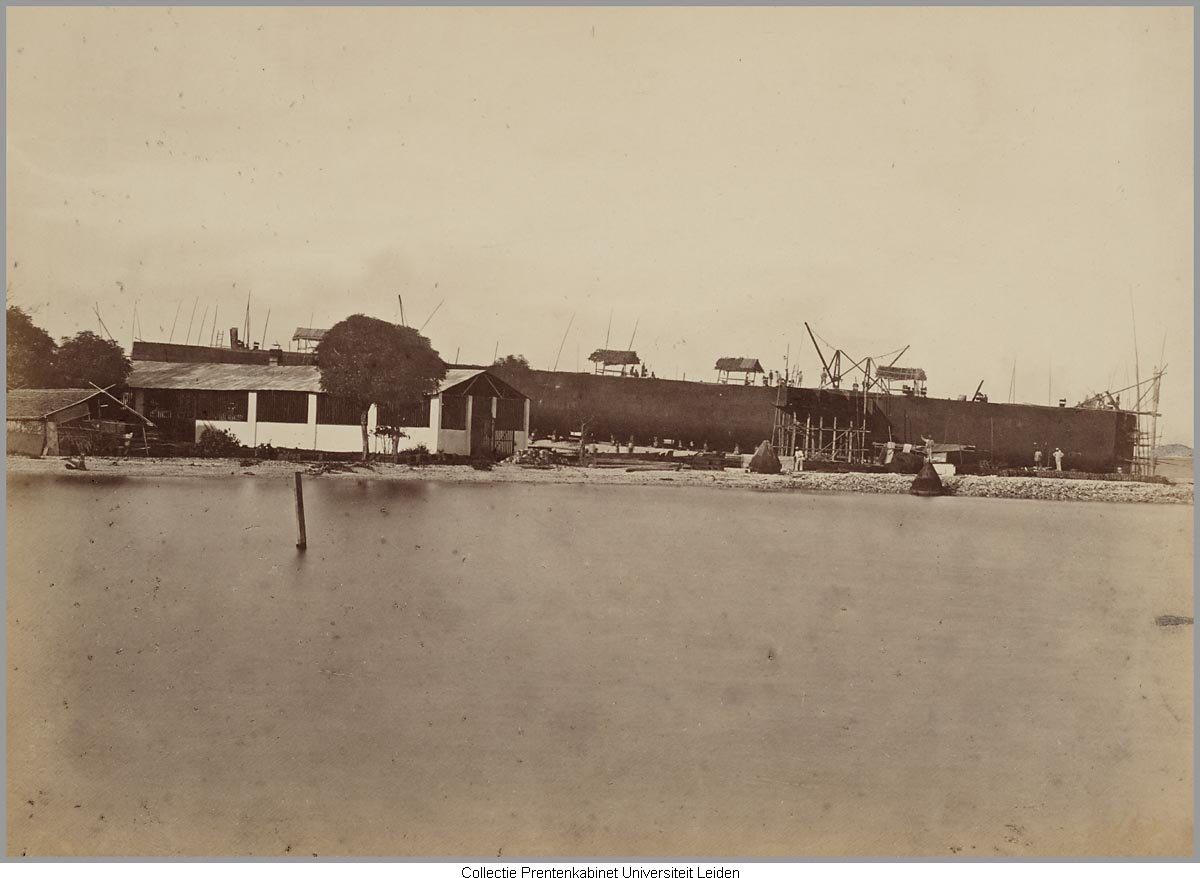
Batavia Dock on the slipway at Amsterdam Island in 1876 seen from the west

The parts of Batavia Dock would be assembled at Amsterdam Island. On 6 February 1874 the management of the NIDM in the East Indies inspected the islands Amsterdam (now Untung Jawa) and Middelburg (Rambut) part of the Thousand Islands. They liked the general conditions on Amsterdam Island and found a location on its southern coast. Here the water was on average 8 fathoms (i.e. 48 feet) deep at 35 meters from the shore. Enough for ships to anchor, and for the dry dock to be lowered deeply enough to receive ships.

On 16 June 1874 Prinses Amalia sailed from Nieuwediep for Southampton and ultimately Batavia. In the evening of the 17th she arrived in Southampton. On 19 June she left Southampton again. On 29 June she arrived in Naples, from whence she left on the morrow. On 2 July she was at Port Said. On 6 July she left Suez. On 24 July 1874 Prinses Amalia arrived in Padang. On 31 July she arrived in Batavia. She was not expected in Samarang before 13 August because: 'the unloading of the dock that she brought would take some days'. Indeed, the drydock consisted of 4,880 packages of ironwork and machinery. On 12 August County of Lancaster arrived in Batavia. She brought 1118 pieces of machinery, and 3,000 piculs stones for 'The dry dock company' to Batavia.

To all appearances the dock was unloaded and Batavia and then shipped to Amsterdam Island. Here contractor Raalte, Behrend & Co had her subcontractor led by James Donald assemble the ship. This was indeed Engineer James Donald of contractor Hanna, Donald & Wilson. In November 1874 there were riots with the local population on Amsterdam Island, caused by the behavior of one of the employees of the contractor. By June 1875 the construction of Batavia Dock was said to make good progress. By August 1876 Batavia Dock was expected to be in service before the end of 1876. Meanwhile, a pier and other facilities were already complete.

=== Launched ===
The plan to have Batavia Dock before the end of 1876 would not succeed. On 22 November 1876 a select company headed by the Governor-General of the Dutch East Indies steamed to Amsterdam Island to witness the launch of Batavia Dock. It was a grand happening, but when Batavia Dock had to get to sea, she did not move more than 20 cm. From that moment the contractor would forfeit 7,000 guilders a month. One of the special circumstances at the launch was that Batavia Dock did not have a keel, and therefore lay on two 'rails', instead of one. The launch took place without the towers being connected, so one can doubt that a successful would have meant that the dry dock would have been operational before the end of the year.

Preparations were made to launch Batavia Dock on 25 January 1877. The steamers Amboina and Batavia had been chartered to pull the dry dock from the slipway at seven o'clock in the morning. While preparations were made the dock suddenly started to move, and except for the stern, she was in the water before the steamers had arrived. The remaining problem would be manageable because by itself the dock had a draught of only 6 feet. On 10 February 1877 the launch of Batavia Dock was finally completed.

=== Batavia Dock sinks ===
Launching a vessel does not mean that it's ready, and so it was with Batavia Dock. More than a year after her launch, in June 1878 she was probably almost finished, because one hoped to commission here in August. Meanwhile, a bed had been made on the sea bottom so that if the dry dock would sink by accident, it would not be damaged, and could easily be lifted.

For some time there had been rumors that 'the work was not solid', 'badly riveted', or would 'never suffice' etc., but nobody knew the truth about it. Nothing had been stated or proven. Now a test was done with the head of the dock facing the land. The part of the dock on the landside was slowly filled with water to lower it, and this part of the test succeeded. One then continued on the sea side, but after some time the water suddenly rushed from one side to the other side of the dock. Obviously because the inner bulkheads collapsed. Next the dock slowly started to sink deeper till only the top of part of her visible. On the land side the water was 30 feet deep, on the sea 60 feet.

This happened in the night of 22–23 August 1878 the dry dock sank. Afterwards James Donald was blamed for having tested the dry dock on his own accord, without consent of the consent of the management, and knowing that the bed did not meet the requirements. At least this is what NIDM and Raalte, Behrend & Co stated in a contract they made to solve the situation.

=== Financial consequences and attempts to lift the dock ===
The March 1879 contract between NIDM and Raalte, Behrend & Co attempted to solve the consequences of the disaster. In fact it attempted to solve multiple problems. It attempted to ensure that the NIDM would be in business as soon as possible irrespective of the faith of Batavia Dock. This would be done by Raalte, Behrend & Co immediately providing about 15,000 GBP in cash to bring at least the smaller dock into operation. In return NIDM would give Raalte, Behrend & Co another opportunity to lift and deliver Batavia Dock.

If Batavia Dock would be lifted and delivered within a certain time frame, Raalte, Behrend & Co would receive 523 shares of 1,000 guilders each in the NIDM. The second option was that Batavia Dock would be lifted, but that repair would not be found to be economical. The third option was that the wreck would not be lifted. In both latter cases Raalte, Behrend & Co would loose the right to the 523 shares, would have to pay 15,000 GBP in cash, 7,000 GBP in shares and 4,000 GBP in bonds. In return NIDM would refrain from any legal action against Raalte, Behrend & Co and her guarantors.

Meanwhile, the operations of guarantor City of Glasgow Bank had been suspended in November 1877, and had been followed by a spectacular collapse on 2 October 1878. It subsequently led to the bankruptcy of shipyard Hanna, Donald & Wilson, subcontractor for Raalte, Behrend & Co. One can therefore doubt that the above contract was fulfilled. In 1880 Raalte, Behrend & Co gave up its attempts to lift the big dock, and paid the indemnities of 100,000 guilders connected to the third case above. However, the GBP to guilder exchange was about 12:1, and so 100,000 guilders came to only 8,333 GBP, way less than 15,000 GBP.

== Characteristics ==
The dimensions of Batavia Dock had been specified in a contract. The 'ship hull' was to have a length of 354 feet, beam 40 feet, hold 17 feet. The arms between the hull and the towers were 45 feet long. The towers were 152 feet apart in the length of the ship, and 135 feet in the beam.

Some functional requirements were also specified in the contract. Batavia Dock had to be able to lift a 4,000 tonnage ship of 350 feet long and a draught of 18 feet. The inner width between the towers should allow a peddle-steamer with a beam of 100 feet over the peddle boxes, to use the dock. The towers should stick out 25 feet above the dock floor. She had to be able to submerge so deep that a ship of 23–24 feet draught could use it. All this would make her suitable for the biggest ships like the Kosmopoliet and the ships of the Stoomvaart Maatschappij Nederland. She could also dock Volharding Dock, and the width even allowed her to dock Onrust Dock of 3,000 tons.

Batavia Dock would have four pumps. The construction had to be able so tough and reinforced that it could withstand a pressure of 9 tons per square inch. She should be stable enough to hold a complete warship while the wind blew from one side with a force of 30 English pounds per square foot. Batavia Dock was not self-docking like the dry docks that were built only a few years later. Instead the small Volharding Dock should be able to lift the larger dry dock and vice versa.

== Later Salvage Attempts ==
=== NIDM ===
The NIDM finally became operational when it started to use Volharding Dock on 29 November 1881. It's likely that after the ties with Raalte, Behrend & Co had been broken in 1880, the NIDM made her own attempts to lift Batavia Dock. In January 1884 it was said that 60,000 guilders had been spent on attempts to lift the dock. On 21 January 1884 the NIDM decided to liquidate the company. The reason given was that Volharding Dock was not able to service modern ships, that were generally too big for her.

=== Mij. tot Exploitatie van Droogdokken en Scheepstimmerwerven ===
On 8 November 1884 Volharding Dock was sold to the Factorij der Nederlandsche Handelsmaatschappij for 50,000 guilders. NHM bought it on account of Wurfbain en Zoon in Amsterdam. Volharding Dock was then transferred to the new Maatschappij tot Exploitatie van Droogdokken en Scheepstimmerwerven in Nederlands-Indië. The founders of this company also bought Batavia Dock, obviously with an eye to a salvage attempt. It's not known whether any such attempt was made.

=== Current status ===
In 1925 Amsterdam Island still showed the remains of a Dockyard. The wreck of Batavia Dock was also on the south side of the island, and mentioned as a danger to shipping.
