= Volharding Dock =

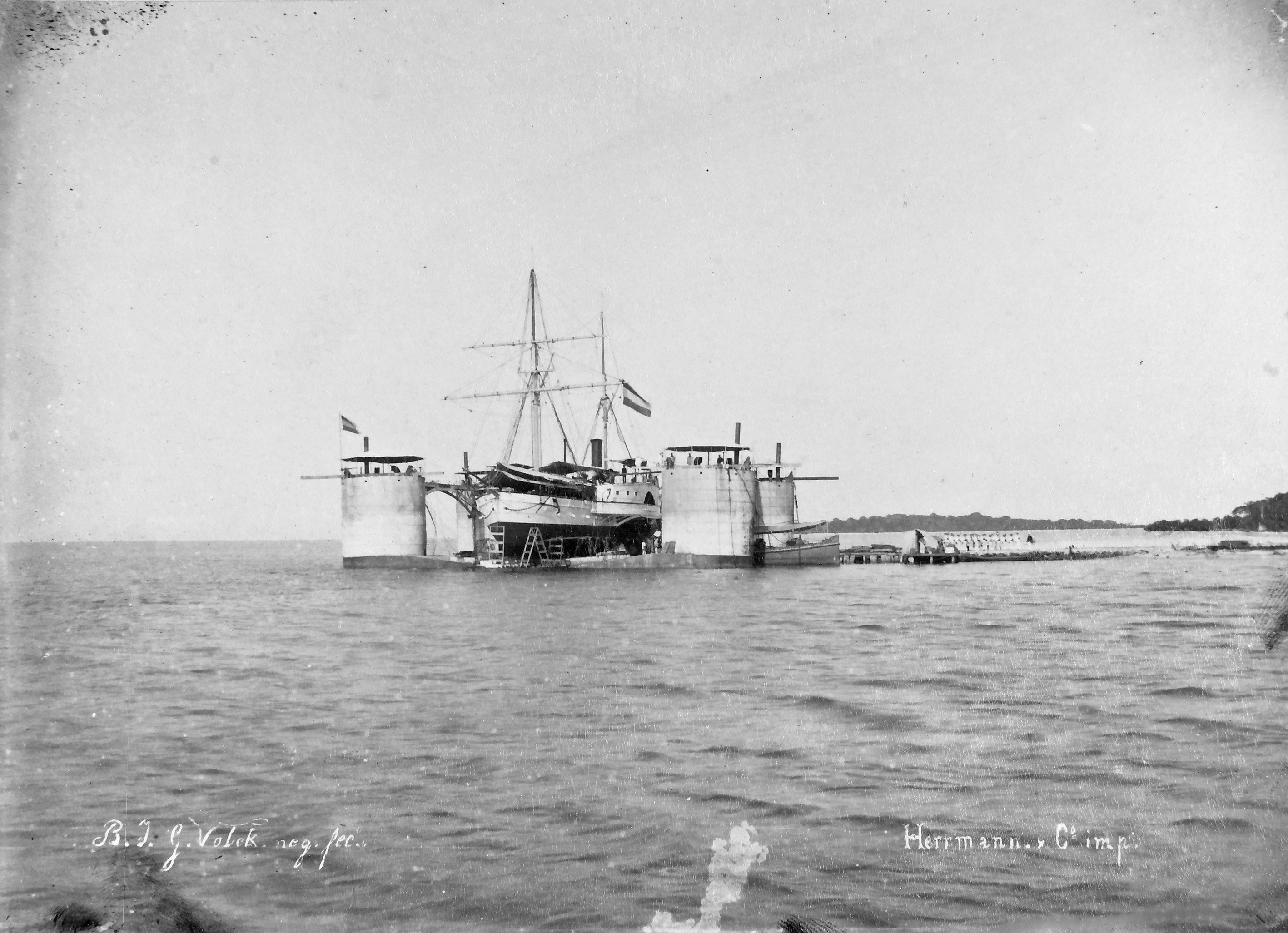
- Volharding Dock c. 1890, was a tower dock, a unique concept for a dry dock

History

Netherlands
- Name: Volharding Dock
- Builder: Hanna, Donald & Wilson
- Launched: 4 June 1874
- Christened: 3 December 1881
- Commissioned: 29 November 1881
- Out of service: sunk 28 March 1894

General characteristics (as completed)
- Length: 61.00 m (200.1 ft)
- Beam: 25.00 m (82.0 ft)
- Draft: 15.50 m (50.9 ft)
- Depth of hold: 20.00 m (65.6 ft)

Volharding Dock, was a floating dry dock built for the Nederlands Indische Droogdok Maatschappij (NIDM) in the 1870s. It was the smallest of two unique tower dry docks, and the only one that would actually be put in use.

== Context ==
=== Dry dock capacity in the Dutch East Indies ===
In the 1850s there were only two dry docks in the Dutch East Indies, both made of wood. Meanwhile the demand for dry dock capacity increased sharply. In the 1860s one of the first iron dry docks ever built appeared in the Dutch East Indies. It was the commercial iron dry dock for the shipping line of Cores de Vries, built by Randolph, Elder and Co. After being assembled in the Indies, she sunk during her trial in Surabaya in 1863. The Dutch Navy reacted to the demand by sending the iron Onrust Dock of 3,000 tons. This iron dry dock arrived at Onrust Island near Batavia on 4 November 1869. She would prove remarkably durable, but was owned by the navy.

=== The NIDM ===
Since 1 January 1869 civilian ships were no longer allowed in the government dry docks of the East Indies. An exception was made for the ships of the Nederlands Indische Stoomvaart Maatschappij (NISM), which executed a government task. An exception was also made for emergency repairs. However, in general there was no dry dock capacity for merchant ships in Batavia, capital of the Dutch East Indies, Instead commercial ships went to Singapore. The operations of Onrust Dock of 3,000 tons which serviced a number of warships and a few passenger ships of the NISM, proved that an iron dry dock could be brought to the East Indies and could successfully operate there.

In 1871 plans were made for what would later become the Nederlands Indische Droogdok Maatschappij (NIDM) or Netherlands Indies Drydock Company. The plan was to found two complete repair shipyards, including smithy, carpentry etc. One for Batavia on Onrust Island, and one for Surabaya. Each would include a dry dock.

In 1872 a committee started to interest shareholders to found the NIDM. In the Netherlands Prince Henry of the Netherlands (1820–1879) supported the company. It offered 900 shares of 1,000 guilders each and 1,500,000 guilders in bonds of 6% interest, but met with limited enthusiasm. The inhabitants of the Dutch East Indies were even more skeptical. On 30 September 1872 a meeting for potential Dutch East Indian shareholders was held in Batavia. Here many doubts were expressed, especially about the assumptions and calculations in the prospectus. Not many potential East Indies shareholders were prepared to participate, and of those that were prepared some put conditions on their participation. The conditions related to: Where the drydock for Batavia would be placed; the viability of a dry dock at Surabaya; the executive of the company and some other points. The first subscription to raise the required capital started on 1 and 2 October 1872 and failed miserably when it got stuck at 25% of the required capital.

Now the founders of the NIDM turned to British investors, and these were indeed prepared to step in. By 27 March 1873 the public company that was being formed had made a provisional contract with the British partnership Raalte, Behrend and Co. from Glasgow, which also had the role of contractor. Of this partnership Jacques van Raalte, Dutch consul in Glasgow, was a relation of the famous Dutch engineer B.J. Tideman. Payment would be in cash, shares and bonds in the measure that the work progressed. Now there would be 1,600 shares and 800 bonds. Three guarantors were backed up by the City of Glasgow Bank. If the NIDM would be founded before 1 May 1873, the works would be delivered in about two years. Due to this agreement the committee was only 360 shares short on 27 March. By 15 April 1873 the remaining shares had been placed.

== Ordering and Construction ==
=== Ordering ===
The original plan was to order the dry docks at Van Vlissingen en Dudok van Heel, which had recently built Onrust Dock of 3,000 tons for a very competitive price. When the founders of the NIDM made a contract with Raalte, Behrend and Co. This company and the investors involved demanded that the dry docks would be made by English shipbuilders. Raalte, Behrend and Co. would place the order at Hanna, Donald & Wilson. The dry docks would be constructed according to the system 'James Scott', but this completely new system would be abandoned.

After the NIDM had been founded it negotiated a final contract with Raalte, Behrend and Co. In this October 1873 contract an equally innovative design by B.J. Tideman was adopted for the large dry dock. After the station for the smaller dry dock had been determined, it was decided that it would also be built according to this system. The contract demanded that the first dry dock (no matter which one) had to be ready near Batavia on 27 May 1875, the second dry dock on 10 October 1876.

=== Design ===
At the time the biggest challenge for dry docks in the far east was how to get them there. They could not yet be reliably towed, and therefore had to be built or assembled locally. Assembly in a dock pit (a building dock closed by a dam) was an option, but was rejected. Even in the original plan, the NIDM opted for construction on a slipway. It was deemed to be less costly, more effective, and would also yield a terrain / slipway for the new repair shipyard.

Both dry docks would be built according to the Tideman design. The Tideman design was thought to be more suitable for dry docks operating at sea. It consisted of a ship hull that could be submerged and service as a 'pontoon' to lift another ship. Four towers would stabilize the hull and house the engines and pumps that pumped the water out of it. For Volharding Dock the Tideman system solved another problem: the hull could be completely finished in Britain and sail to the Indies, where only the towers would have to be added. This did not apply to the bigger Batavia Dock, which would be assembled on a slipway at Amsterdam Island, now named Pulau Untung Jawa.

=== Construction ===
Volharding Dock was constructed at Hanna, Donald & Wilson. She was launched on 4 June 1874.

=== First attempt to sail to the East Indies ===
On 26 August 1874 Volharding dock sailed from the Clyde as Soerabaja (In the NIDM plan she was destined to become the dry dock in that place). For the voyage to the East Indies it had been provided with a bow, a rudder, an upper deck and three masts. She soon got a problem with her rudder. Others said she was unmanageable. Anyhow, she returned to Glasgow after two days. The rudder was replaced in Garvel Dry dock at Greenock. After she had left the dock on 15 October, she anchored on the Clyde. On 25 October a hurricane then beat two ships from their anchors. These drifted and collided with the Soerabaja, which also began to drift. She ended up on the rocks of Helensburgh where she became a wreck without masts. A less dramatic report was that she was beached near Ardmore Sand. By 30 November she had been unloaded, and divers had closed some holes. She was then brought into the west harbor of Greenock on 24 December, where she was put on the ground. By then she was to have arrived in the Indies. Probably in time to be finished before the deadline of the delivery of the first dock, which stood at 27 May 1875.

=== Final voyage to the East Indies in 341 days ===
The final voyage of Volharding dock to the Dutch East Indies would take 341 days, and was an epic on its own. When Soerabaja was repaired, she again got provisions to be able to sail across the ocean. This time these were described as: masts, a bow and stern, a rudder and a bulwark. The rudder was extremely long, because it had to reach the stream behind the ship, but it was still not long enough to be effective. At that time the deck was only 4.5 feet above water. The loose bulwark was 3 feet high, and open on the bottom, so any water could flow off the deck. She had a barque rigging with 60 feet masts, that would later be reused for a shear legs. She was declared seaworthy by the authorities.

Captain Abraham Herman Zwaneveld became captain of the ship and 18 crew. On 21 July 1875 Soerabaja left Greenock and the Clyde. Soon the captain noticed that the vessel hardly responded to the rudder. During the first days the crew was busy building cabins on the deck, and putting planks on it, so they could use the deck, that was almost always wet. Other measures aimed at increasing the sailing capacities of the vessel.

After 40 days Saint Anthony, westernmost island of Cape Verde was reached on 1 September. Soerabaja slumped across the ocean at a maximum speed of about 5 Dutch miles. On 6 November she reached the equator (106 days). On 24 December she was towed into the Bay of Rio de Janeiro. On 11 January 1876 she left Rio again sailing east. Now the ship got into big trouble due to leakage. Near Île Amsterdam in the Indian Ocean she got a second leak, which was soon stopped. On 16 May she reached Java. The crew ordered assistance. First SS Khiva was sent, but after she did not find Soerabaja, SS Bromo arrived to tow her to Amsterdam Island. Here she anchored on 15 June 1876.

=== Finishing in the Indies ===
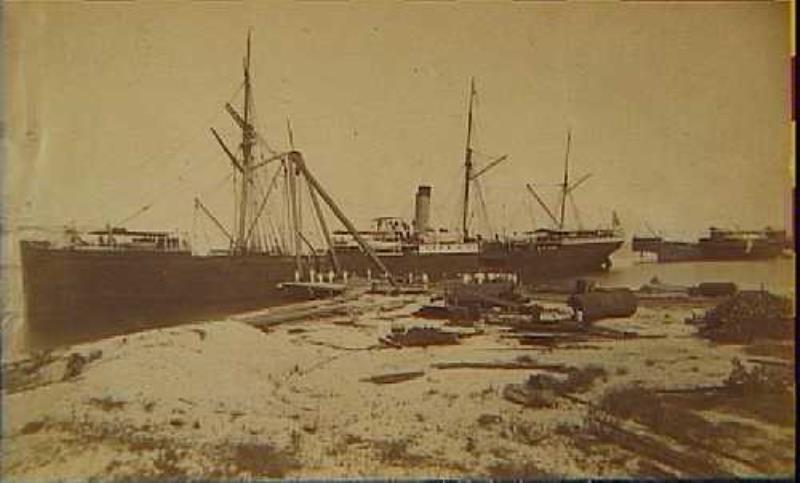
SS Prins Hendrik in port in June 1878. Probably Volharding Dock in the background

When Soerabaja arrived on 15 June 1876 it was more than a year after the deadline for the first dry dock, which had been missed on 27 May 1875. Arrival also did not mean that she was ready for service. The delay in the delivery of both dry docks brought the NIDM into financial difficulties because it delayed her revenues. The NIDM now concentrated on finishing the bigger dry dock, which was launched in February 1877. On 5 March 1878 the NIDM and Raalte, Behrend & Co. made a new contract. According to this contract the big dock was expected to be ready on 31 March 1878, Soerabaja was estimated to be ready on 30 June 1878. On 22 August 1878 the big dock suddenly sank during a trial, and would never resurface. Meanwhile the operations of the City of Glasgow Bank had been suspended in November 1877, and were followed by a spectacular collapse on 2 October 1878. It subsequently led to the bankruptcy of shipyard Hanna, Donald & Wilson, subcontractor for Raalte, Behrend & Co. All this led to a renegotiation of contracts: NIDM would accept the small dry dock and repair facility at Amsterdam Island. Raalte, Behrend & Co would either lift the big dock and deliver it, or would pay the insured sum and other indemnities. Anyhow, the new CEO Mr. O.C.J. Lindemann would depart to Batavia to bring the repair facility and small dry dock in working order as soon as possible.

All this was a financial disaster for the NIDM. The almost total lack of revenue since 1873 led to a default on the 6% bonds in 1880, and a financial restructuring whereby shares lost 85% of their nominal value and the 6% bonds became income bonds. At about the same time Raalte, Behrend & Co gave up its attempts to lift the big dock, and paid the indemnities of about 100,000 guilders. It gave NIDM the means to finish the small dock, which had not been worked on that much due to limited means. The NIDM now expected to finish it in 8–9 months, i.e. July 1881.

== Characteristics ==
When she sailed in 1876 the dimensions of Volharding Dock were given as: Length 200 feet, beam 25 feet, hold 20 feet, draught 15.5 feet. Other specifications were in the contract. She had to be able to lift a 2,000 tons ship of 18 feet draught. Minimum keel length docked should be 200 feet, and she should be able to dock peddle ships with a total beam (including peddle boxes) of 72 English feet. There would be four pumps in the dock. Each of these pumps was in a tower of 25 feet diameter, which also housed a 'vertical' steam boiler.

Volharding Dock was not self-docking like the dry docks that were built only a few years later. Instead the small Volharding Dock should be able to lift the larger dry dock and vice versa.

== Service ==
=== At Amsterdam Island ===
On 29 November 1881 the steam ship Amsterdam (owned by NIDM) was docked by the Volharding Dock. On 3 December 1881 about thirty gentlemen from Batavia then visited the dock. Mr. Falk, president of the Supervisory Board of the NIDM made a speech in which he shortly summarized the disasters that the NIDM had faced up till then. He then praised the determination of CEO Lindemann and his staff of employees, and christened the dry dock: Volharding (determination). Lindemann put the dock to work, there was a lot of champagne, and each employee got a reward of 100 guilders. On 6 December Biliton was to be docked. Biliton left the dock again on 12 December.

In the first regular meeting of NIDM shareholders on 31 July 1882 there was no public mention of ships having used the dry dock. 1882 would be the first year of regular exploitation for Volharding Dock. On 22 April 1882 Sindoro of Captain Hille and the French Burdigala of Captain Maroussem were reported as repairing / docking at Amsterdam Island. On 3 June Sindoro was still repairing at Amsterdam Island. The annual report over 1882 summarized how disappointing 1882 had been. The dock was used for 132 days by only 11 ships. Three of these sailing ships. There was only one major repair job, all others were minor repairs. The cause of the limited employ was sought in the small number of damaged ships in Batavia, as well as the limited size of the dock.

=== NIDM loses the concession ===
Meanwhile the Dutch government had started the construction of a decent harbor for Batavia at Tanjung Priok in 1877. This would sharply increase the number of commercial ships seeking dry dock capacity. It opened up good prospects for the NIDM. Her contract with the state stipulated that after NIDM had a suitable dry dock in operation, government dry docks would no longer service commercial ships. On 29 April 1882 a commission was appointed to determine whether Volharding Dock qualified as a suitable dock. It had to be able to service the biggest type of commercial ships that could then be expected in the Dutch East Indies, and all ships of the Nederlandsch-Indische Stoomvaartmaatschappij (NISM). Furthermore the repair facilities had to be able to execute all repairs to these ships. The commission judged that Volharding Dock and the repair shipyard of the NIDM were neither a suitable drydock, nor a suitable repair facility.

The loss of the concession was very important for NIDM. The concession did not give her an exclusive right to operate dry docks for Batavia, but it would most probably enable NIDM to prevent the state from aiding a competitor to set up shop in Tanjung Priok. NIDM then started to think about lengthening the dock, selling it, or using the dock at another place.

In connection to the new plans NIDM tried to register its ownership of the dry dock at the cadastre in Batavia. The reason was a loan the NIDM had got from Wurfbain en Zoon, and which required a mortgage on the dry dock. However, when NIDM arrived at the cadastre, registration was refused. Both parties then agreed to take the matter of whether the dry dock was a ship to the High Court of Batavia. The court judged that at that moment, the dry dock was not a ship in the sense of the law. The main reason was that its purpose was to serve as a floating work place, not as a means to transport people and cargo. Soerabaja had indeed very much resembled a ship during its epic journey to the Dutch East Indies. However, the length of the trip proved that the dry dock had been the 'object of transport, not a means of transport'. Thus the NIDM lost its attempt to mortgage the dry dock, but this was not the end of its troubles.

=== Krakatoa eruption ===
The 27 August 1883 eruption of Krakatoa generated a tsunami that hit Amsterdam Island. It tore Volharding dock from its anchors and took it to Bidadari (Purmerend Island), where it became beached. Later it was said to have drifted to Middelburg Island. Whatever happened exactly, Volharding dock was back at Amsterdam Island by 10 September 1884.

=== The NIDM is liquidated ===
On 21 January 1884 the NIDM decided to liquidate the company. The reason given was that Volharding dock was too small to service big ships. On 8 November 1884 Volharding dock was sold to the Factorij der Nederlandsche Handelsmaatschappij for 50,000 guilders. NHM bought it on account of Wurfbain en Zoon in Amsterdam.

=== Attempts to found a new company ===
Wurfbain en Zoon now attempted to found the Maatschappij tot Exploitatie van Droogdokken en Scheepstimmerwerven in Nederlands-Indië. In September 1885 the outline of this company became clear. It was to be formed out of a merger of the remnants of the NIDM at Amsterdam Island owned by Wurfbain, and the Shipyard of Tromp, De Haas, Schey and Co in Surabaya. These assets were assessed at 650,000 guilders. On account of this attempt critics noted that Volharding dock was only suitable to dock more than half of the wooden sailing ships, but that these only docked when they needed repairs. Which was seldom, weeks had passed without any such repair being needed. Furthermore, iron ships needed more docking, but these were almost all too large for Volharding dock. The East indies government also did not promote this attempt. In June 1885 it recognized Mr. F. Alting du Cloux as concessionary for dry docks in Batavia.

=== Volharding dock is used for several years ===
What is interesting it that the founders of the new company noted that Volharding dock had been in use again since 1 May 1885, servicing six sailing ships and one steamship for 90 dock days This could have been as exaggerated as the rest of the company's publicity, but since then some ships were indeed docked. On 23 November 1885 the composite ship Amstel of 1,700 tons was docked to be repaired. In September 1886 the English barque Peeblshire was inspected in the dock. In February 1887 the government ship Argus docked for repairs. In October 1888 the government ship Blommendal was docked. In November 1888 HNLMs Oenarang was docked. In September 1889 Blommendal was docked for cleaning and painting. In March 1891 Blommendal again used the dock. In April and May 1891 the steam peddler HNLMS Onrust used the dock. In May 1891 SS Reijniersz used the dock at Amsterdam Island.

The end of the Amsterdam Island repair shop and dry dock came about by competition. In Tanjung Priok the Droogdok-maatschappij Tandjong Priok was founded in 1890 It would lease Onrust Dock of 3,000 tons from the state. After her arrival in November 1891 there was little reason left for ships to visit Amsterdam Island. On 28 March 1893 the dry dock was put up for auction. It seems the auction failed, because Volharding dock was towed to Surabaya in December 1893.

=== End in Surabaya ===
On 26 December 1893 Volharding dock arrived in Surabaya towed by Carolina Johanna. On 28 March 1894 the dock tried to lift a small vessel of the company that had to be repaired anyway. When the water was pumped out of the dock, the tower on the north-western side suddenly collapsed, and the dock sank.
