= Untung Jawa (Amsterdam Island) =

Island in Indonesia

Pulau Untung Jawa
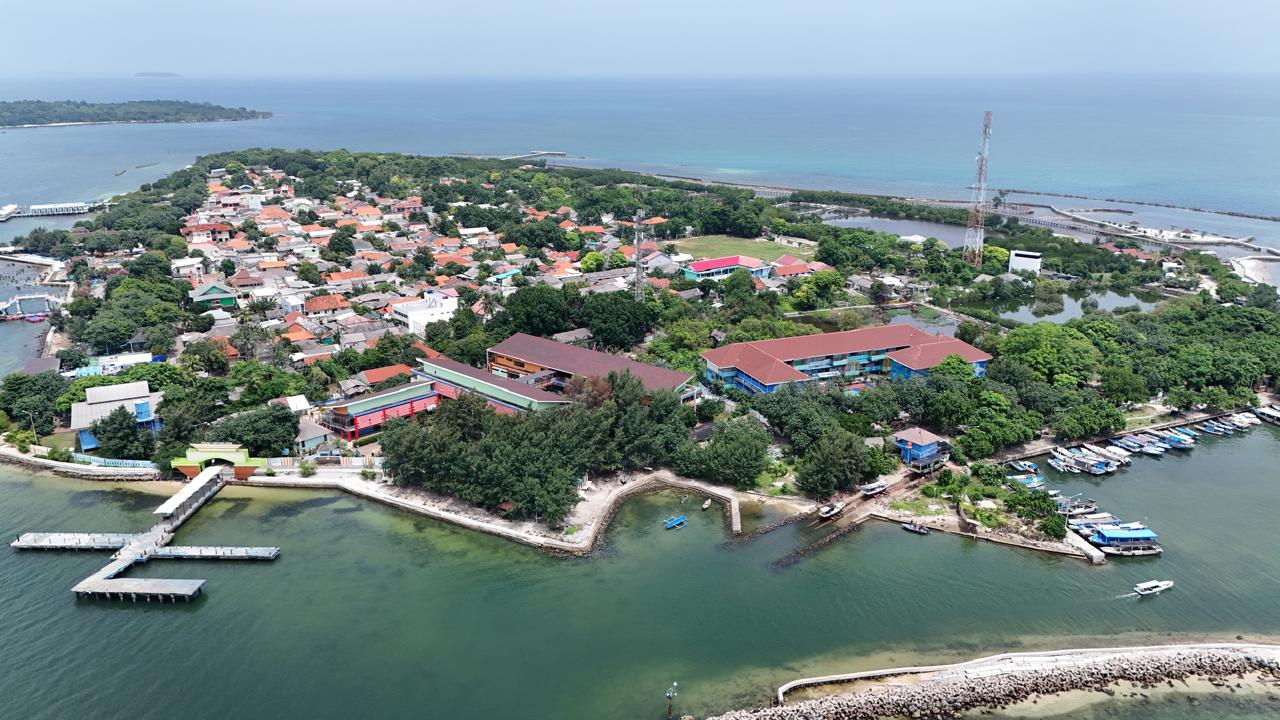

- Location within Indonesia

Geography
- Location: South East Asia
- Coordinates: 5.977°S 106.707°E
- Area: 1.03 km^{2} (0.40 sq mi)
- Indonesia

Demographics
- Population: 2,264 (2017)
- Pop. density: 2.198/km^{2} (5.693/sq mi)

Untung Jawa, previously known as Amsterdam Island is an Indonesian island off the coast of Jakarta. It is part of the Thousand Islands and the capital of Kelurahan (administrative village) Pulau Untung Jawa.

== Geography ==
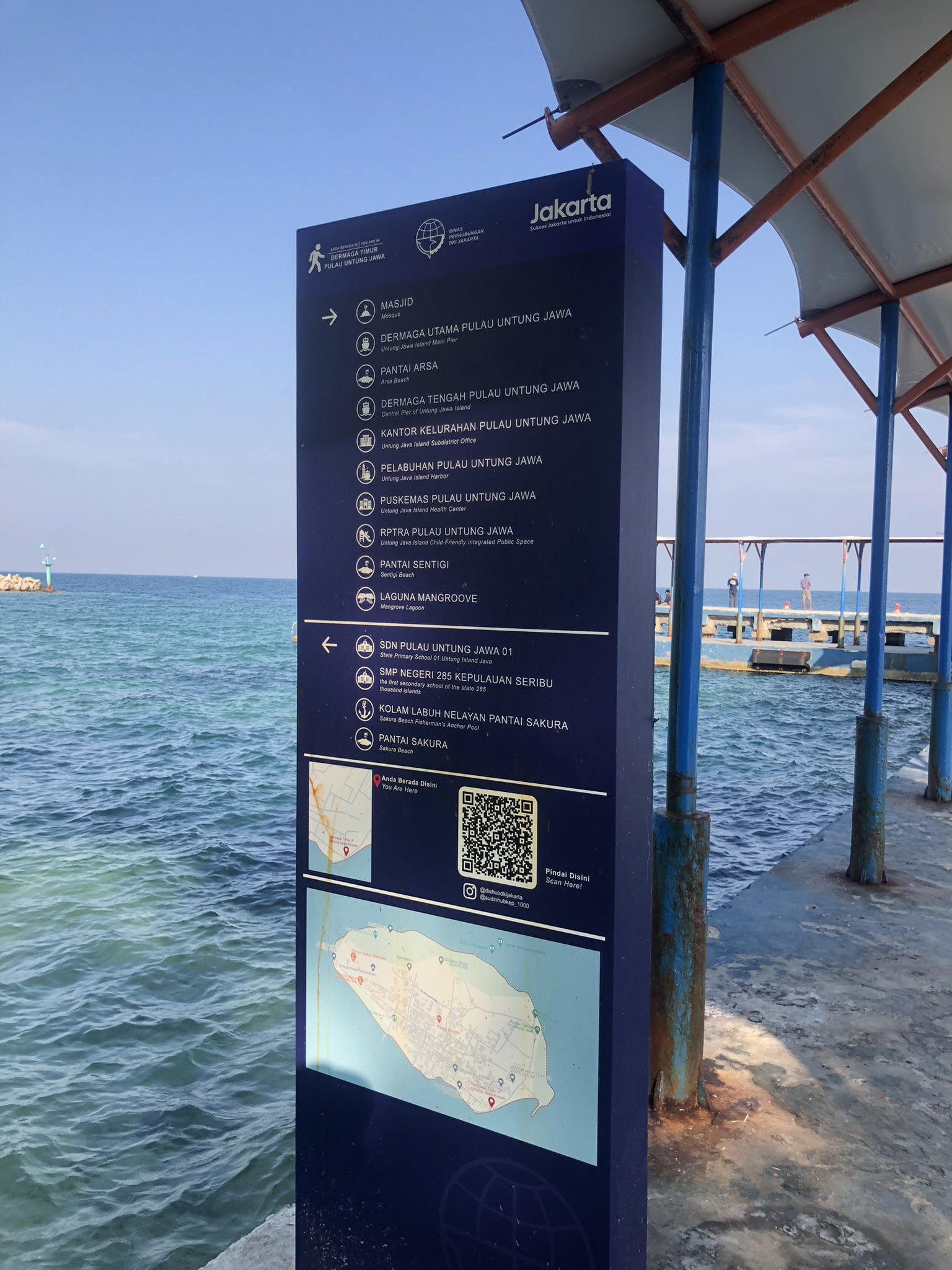
The island map

The Thousand Islands are basically coral reefs. In the nineteenth century Amsterdam Island was said to have been the longest continuously inhabited island of the Thousand Islands. It had fresh water, and the coral was covered by a thick layer of humus, making it malaria free. It had many trees, some of them very old and big. The island is close to deep water, making it a good harbor for big ships.

== History ==
=== The Dutch East India Company ===
The Dutch presence in the area started when the Dutch East India Company (VOC) established a naval base at nearby Onrust Island in 1613. In 1619 the Dutch then managed to conquer nearby Jakarta, renamed it Batavia, and made it the capital of the Dutch East Indies. Ships were able to anchor before Jakarta, but could not reach the shore there. At Onrust Island ships could reach up to the shore to get careened. Therefore, Onrust Island was developed into a small town protected by a fortress.

As a natural harbor, Amsterdam Island had the same advantage as Onrust Island. However, it was about 10 km further away from Batavia. On the other hand, it did not have the horrible sanitary reputation that Onrust Island had. Anyway, during the time that the VOC ruled the area, nothing was done on Amsterdam Island.

=== Steam power and state docking facilities ===
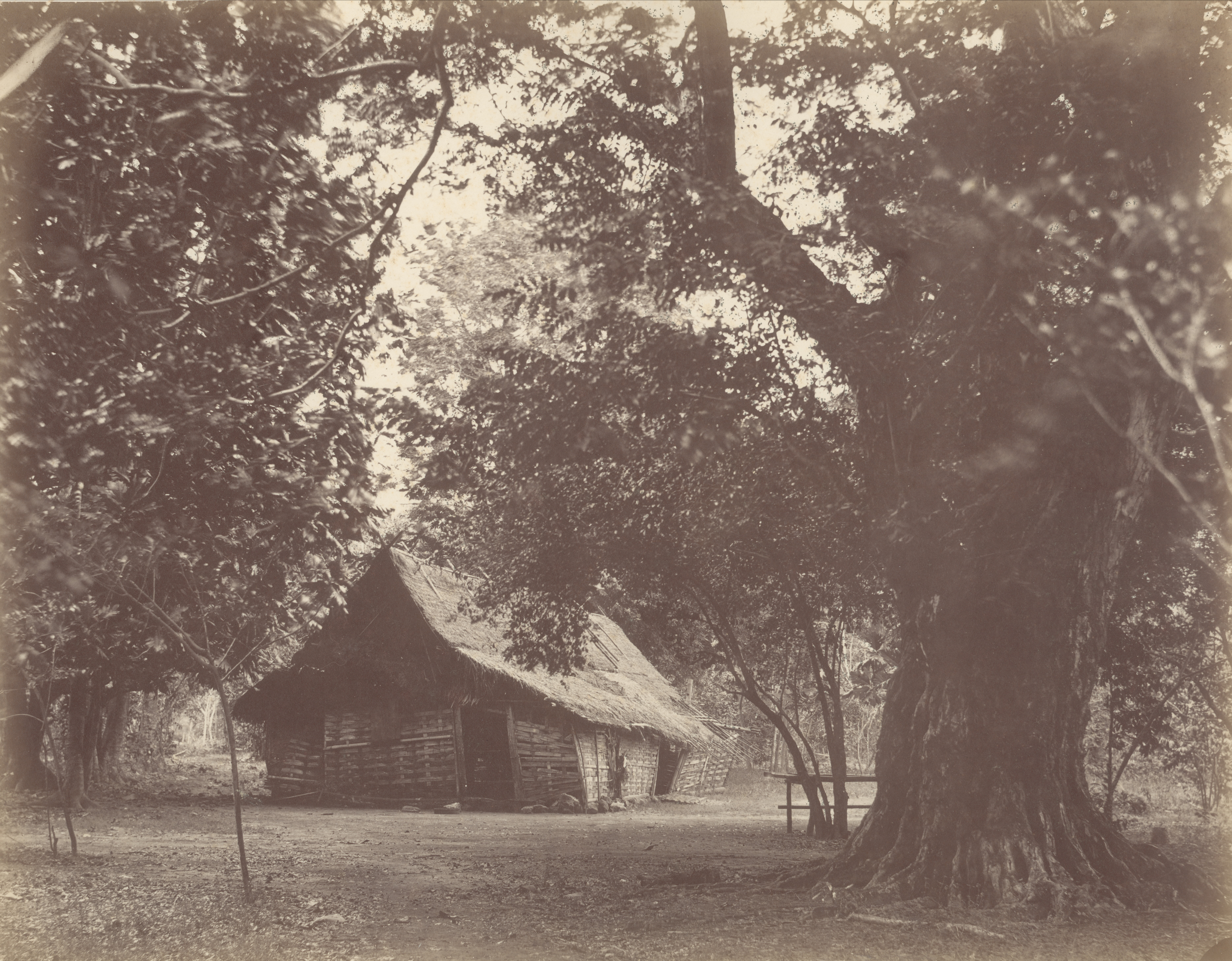
Fisherman's house and big tree on Amsterdam Island (Untung Jawa) in 1876.

In 1816 the Kingdom of the Netherlands took control of the Thousand Islands. During the mid-nineteenth century Onrust Island was developed as a state naval base. Meanwhile, the introduction of steam power made that careening became problematic. Steamships had to have their boilers and engines removed for the operation, and for paddle steamers the side wheels also had to be removed. Furthermore, careening was very detrimental to the hull, and this effect increased with size of the ships. Therefore, dry docks were required in the East Indies. In 1856 Onrust got a wooden dry dock owned by the Dutch navy. In November 1869 the iron Onrust Dock of 3,000 tons arrived at Onrust. It started a period wherein Onrust was the main naval repair shipyard in the Dutch East Indies.

=== Commercial docking facilities ===
The lack of docking facilities in the Dutch East Indies was often part of an ideological debate. The Dutch government did not want to provide repair facilities for commercial ships. The reasoning was that as long as the government provided docking facilities, private enterprise would not invest in dry docks in the Dutch East Indies.

=== NIDM ===
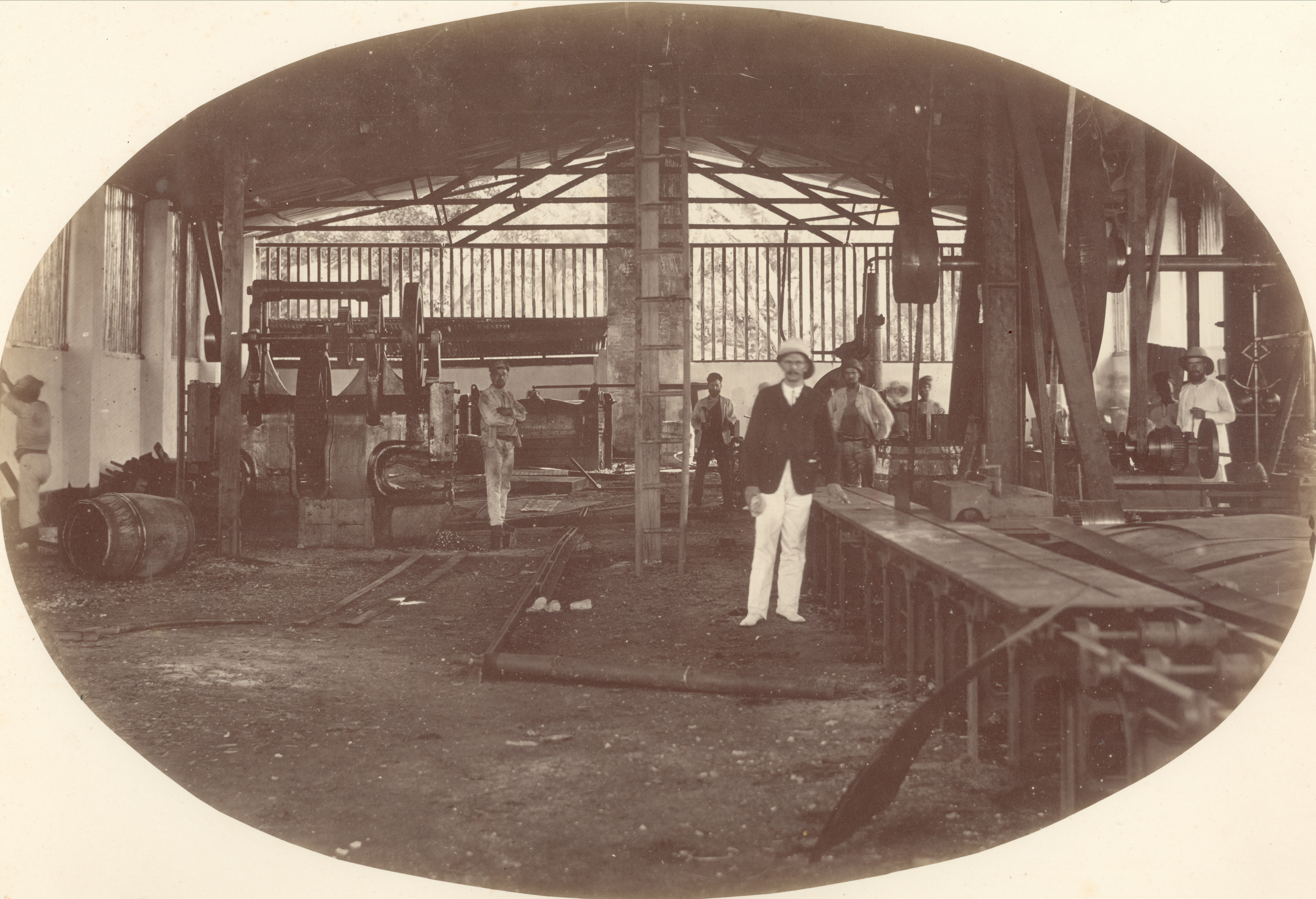
Shipyard of the NIDM on Amsterdam Island in 1876

In 1871 plans were made for what would later become the Nederlands Indische Droogdok Maatschappij (NIDM) or Netherlands Indies Drydock Company. The plan was to found two complete repair shipyards, including smithy, carpentry etc. One repair shipyard would service Batavia, the other Surabaya. Each would include a dry dock. The first attempts to raise the required capital failed, and in the end British investors stepped in. By 15 April 1873 the last shares were placed and the NIDM was founded.

On 6 February 1874 the management of the NIDM in the East Indies inspected Amsterdam Island and the island Middelburg (Rambut). They liked the general conditions on Amsterdam Island and found a location on its southern coast. Here the water was on average 8 fathoms (i.e. 48 feet) deep at 35 meters from the shore. Enough for ships to anchor, and for the dry dock to be lowered deeply enough to receive ships.

The biggest asset of the shipyard would be Batavia Dock. This was a massive 354 feet long iron dry dock that was supposed to be able to lift most existing merchant ships. The parts of Batavia Dock would be assembled at Amsterdam Island. In August 1874 3,000 piculs of stones were brought from Europe to Batavia for 'the dry dock company'. In November 1874 there were riots with the local population on Amsterdam Island, caused by the behavior of one of the employees of the contractor. By August 1876 Batavia Dock was expected to be in service before the end of 1876. In February 1877 Batavia Dock was finally launched.

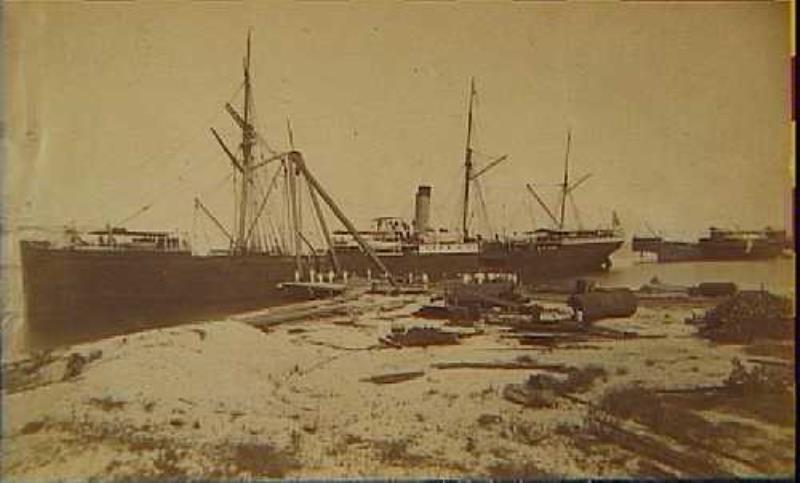
SS Prins Hendrik opened the harbor in June 1878.

Meanwhile, a pier and other facilities were already complete by November 1876. By then the number of buildings on the island had increased from 24 to 80. On 5 June 1878 SS Prins Hendrik of the SMN, a shipping line which was also a shareholder of the NIDM, became the first ship to use the port. The repair shipyard included a shipyard with all kinds of machinery, a shear legs and a coaling station. The one crucial asset that was still missing was a dry dock, but this was under way.

A few months later Batavia Dock then sank in deep water during a trial in August 1878. As an alternative route to completing the repair shipyard, NIDM then focused on finishing the smaller Volharding Dock, which had originally been meant for Surabaya. In November 1881 the repair shipyard at Amsterdam Island finally became fully operational. 1882 would be the first year of regular exploitation for the shipyard. The annual report over 1882 summarized how disappointing 1882 was. The dock was used for 132 days by only 11 ships. Three of these sailing ships. There was only one major repair job, all others were minor repairs. The cause of the limited employ was sought in the small number of damaged ships in Batavia, as well as the limited size of the dock. NIDM started to think about lengthening the dock, selling it, or using the dock at another place.

However, worse was still to come. The 27 August 1883 eruption of Krakatoa generated a tsunami that hit Amsterdam Island. It tore Volharding dock from its anchors and took it to Bidadari (Purmerend Island), where it became beached. Later it was said to have drifted to Middelburg Island. The dock was recovered, but on 21 January 1884 the NIDM decided to liquidate the company. The reason given was that Volharding dock was too small to service big ships. On 8 November 1884 Volharding dock was sold to the Factorij der Nederlandsche Handelsmaatschappij for 50,000 guilders.

This way the attempts to found a major harbor on Amsterdam Island failed. Traces of these works should be visible on the island. Another legacy is a series of photographs made on occasion of the (failed) launch of Batavia Dock.

== Tourism ==
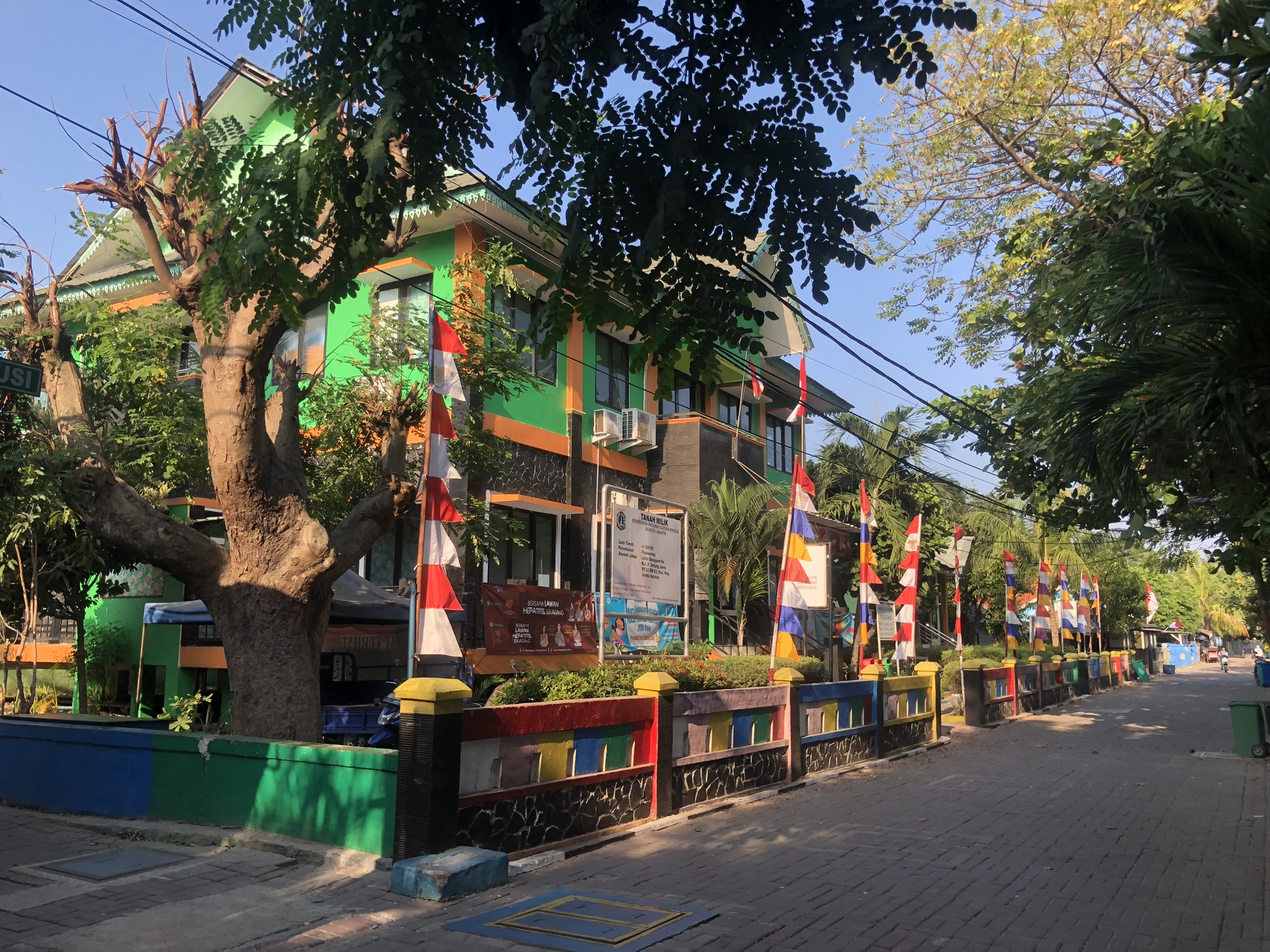
A street on the island

Untung Jawa is now an island devoted to tourism. Many visitors arrive by day trips from Jakarta.

== See also ==
- Thousand Islands (Indonesia)
