= Van Vlissingen en Dudok van Heel =

Dutch machine factory

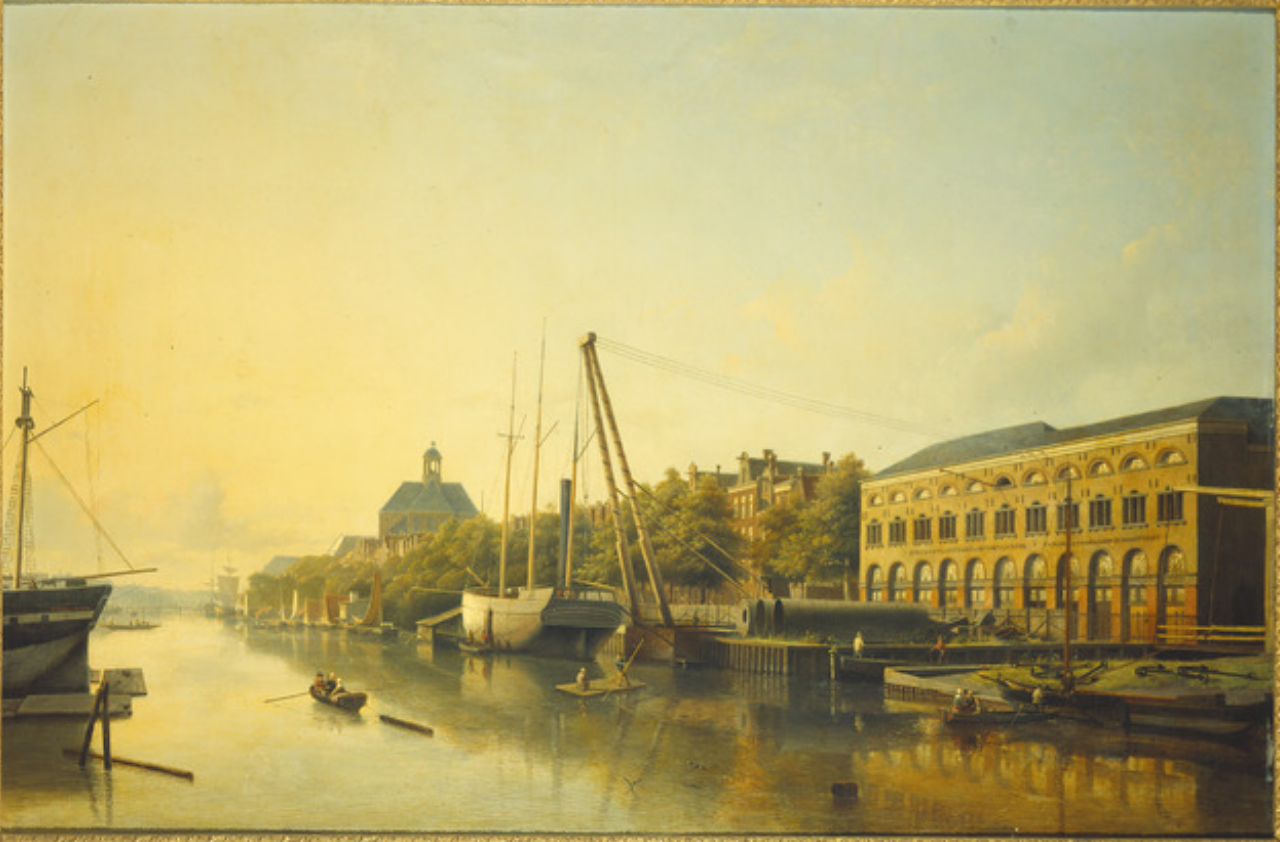
- Factory of Van Vlissingen and Dudok van Heel (to the right) in 1849
- Industry: machines, rolling stock
- Founded: 9 February 1827
- Founder: Paul van Vlissingen, Abraham Dudok van Heel
- Defunct: 19 March 1890
- Headquarters: Amsterdam

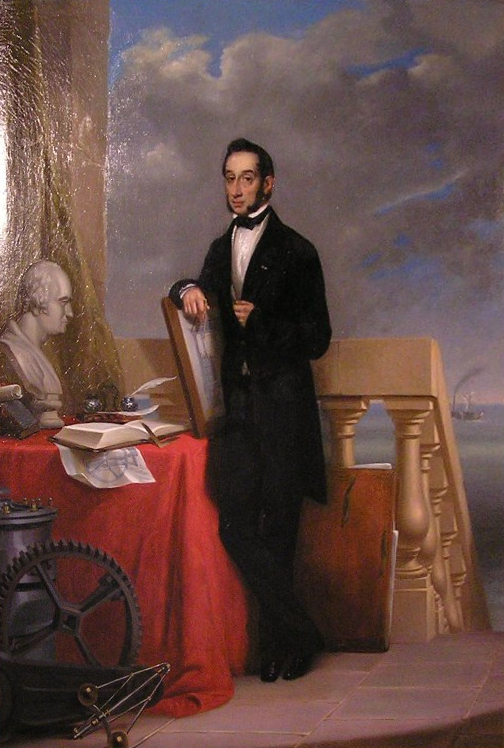
Paul van Vlissingen (1797–1876), oil painting by Jan Braet von Überfeldt.

Van Vlissingen en Dudok van Heel was a famous nineteenth-century Dutch machine factory. It built steam engines and machinery for the sugar industry and for maritime purposes, as well ships, rolling stock and large metal structures like the Moerdijk bridge and a floating dock. In 1871 it was reorganized to become the public company Koninklijke Fabriek van Stoom- en andere Werktuigen. In a second reorganization in 1890, parts of it were saved and continued under the name Koninklijke Nederlandsche Fabriek van Werktuigen en Spoorwegmaterieel, renamed to Werkspoor in 1927.

== Van Vlissingen en Dudok van Heel ==
=== Early years ===
The company was founded as the 'Van Vlissingen' company in 1826. The founder was Paul van Vlissingen (1797–1876), who was also one of the founders of the Amsterdamsche Stoomboot Maatschappij (ASM). In 1828 Abraham Dudok van Heel (1802–1873) became a partner, and the name was changed to Fabriek van Stoom- en Andere Werktuigen, onder de firma Van Vlissingen & Dudok van Heel. (Factory for steam engines and other tooling, owned by Van Vlissingen & Dudok van Heel.) The onder firma was Dutch for Kommanditgesellschaft a form of Limited partnership.

The first 'mission' of the company would be to enable repair of the steam engines of the ASM. This was necessary because John Cockerill (company, 1825–1955) and the Nederlandsche Stoomboot Maatschappij of Gerhard Moritz Roentgen had established a monopoly on the delivery of steam engines in the Netherlands. In 1826 the ASM, therefore, asked permission from the Amsterdam community council to found a small smithy at the shipyard Vredenburg on the Kadijk. In 1827 a former smoking house of the Dutch East India Company was hired to expand the company. This building, consisting of a house and a large storehouse was situated on the southern tip of the island Oostenburg, that was dominated by buildings previously owned by the Dutch East India Company. The date of the rental contract, 9 February 1827 should be considered as the founding date of the company.

One of the first employees was William Jackson, who had worked at Henry Maudslay and Company. There were thirty other Englishman employed. The building contained two smithies. In the yard there was an oven below a shed without a chimney. Six men operated a double bellows to blaze the fire. The flames escaping through an opening in the roof. The management declared that the oven was fired with Coke (fuel) and would not spark. The 'smelt en gietoven' ('gieten' means Casting (metalworking)) could not be covered, because that would be very bad for the Cast iron. By the end of 1827 the company had 60 employees.

As regards organization the company was a limited partnership, in contemporary Dutch a Commanditaire Societeit. It started with a capital of 100,000 guilders, with 70,000 brought in by the limited partners. Van Vlissingen would only be around part-time, mainly because he also had other affairs like the ASM. Dudok van Heel would be permanently present, primarily to manage the administration and cash of the factory. General Partners Van Vlissingen and Dudok van Heel would receive a compensation of 2,000 guilders for their work. If there was a profit, the partners would first receive 4% on their capital, further profits would be divided somewhat equally over the general partners and the limited partners.

=== 1830s ===
During the first years Van Vlissingen en Dudok van Heel experienced slow growth. It was troubled by the high import duty on sheet metal. A duty that in practice benefited Cockerill, which produced sheet metal, and foreign machine factories which did not have to pay the duty. The independence of Belgium would change the government preference for Cockerill. In time Van Vlissingen en Dudok van Heel got a serious chance to get government orders.

=== 1840s: Royal factory ===
On 4 December 1840 the factory of Van Vlissingen & Dudok van Heel got the label 'royal', officially making it the: Koninklijke Fabriek van Stoom- en andere Werktuigen onder firma Van Vlissingen & Dudok van Heel. In reality the company did not use the name 'Koninklijke Fabriek van Stoom- en andere Werktuigen' that often, and if it did, the name was almost always accompanied by: of Van Vlissingen & Dudok van Heel. A logical explanation would be that the 'firma Van Vlissingen & Dudok van Heel' was a Juridical person, a quality that the 'Koninklijke Fabriek' lacked. The succeeding 'Koninklijke Fabriek van Stoom- en andere Werktuigen' (below, without the 'firma' part) was a juridical person because it was the name of a public company.

By 1847 there were 1000–1200 employees with the company.

=== 1850s ===
In the 1856 Van Vlissingen & Dudok van Heel was the biggest machine factory of the Netherlands, with about 1,600 employees. In 1856 a magazine made a rather extensive report of a visit to the company. It had a description of the iron Foundry. It had three cupola Furnaces, which processed imported cast iron with coke and chalk. Up to 20,000 kilograms of liquid iron was then poured into a crucible and cast again. A big Fan (machine) that made 600 rpm produced the air blast required for the foundry.

=== Activities of Van Vlissingen & Dudok van Heel ===
==== Machines for the Sugar industry ====
In the Dutch colony Suriname Amsterdam citizens had a lot of plantations producing sugar. William Jackson then moved to Suriname to support the installation of sugar mills and steam engines. Jackson also became the representative for the company in Suriname.

==== Steam locomotives ====
From 1843–1846 it produced some steam locomotives. These were called the Etna, Hecla, Vesuvius, Atlas and Bromo. Some of these served till 1866.

==== Ship engines ====
Steam ship engines would become a core activity of the company. In the beginning, the company somewhat depended on or was helped by government purchases. This was especially the case with regard to the first order for a ship engine that Van Vlissingen received. Even though Van Vlissingen had never produced a ship engine, the navy ordered a more powerful (and costly) engine than had yet been produced in the Netherlands. The interest of the navy was that it depended on Van Vlissingen & Dudok van Heel as one of the few producers of steam engines. The state had shipyards, but no capacity to build engines. The close proximity of the Rijkswerf Amsterdam to the factory was also important.

The first order of a ship engine for a warship was that for the 130 hp engines of HNLMS Phoenix (1836). It was also the first-ever order for a ship engine by Van Vlissingen and was awarded for more than 100,000 guilders on 2 December 1834. While these were almost finished a fire broke out at the factory on 24 April 1836 and caused significant damage to the machines and the factory. While the insurance covered a lot, it did not cover a delay in delivery. The government then indeed further supported the company by accepting the delay and giving some additional orders to keep the factory going. In 1837 and 1839 boilers were delivered for the Cerberus and Leeuw. In 1839 the navy ordered the machines for the Hecla costing 109,495 guilders at Van Vlissingen. Later Vlissingen & Dudok van Heel made the 300 hp steam engines for HNLMS steam paddle vessel Gedeh. It also made the 150 hp engine of the Sindoro.

Steam engines for screw-driven ships required a higher rotational speed. The company first made the engine of the Montrado (ex-Vuurpijl). The 150 hp engines of the corvette Amelia ex-Borneo (1855) came next. Those of HNLMS Adolf van Nassau (1861), and of at least two ships of the Djambi-class corvettes, launched 1860–1863 followed. The engines of the Watergeus-class sloops (1864–1867) and those of the Zilveren Kruis (1869) were engines that had an output that gave sailing ships something more than just auxiliary power.

Van Vlissingen & Dudok van Heel also produced ship engines for civilian use. The second pair of ship engines that the company built were the 160 hp engines of the Willem I built by shipyard Boelen for the ASM line to Hamburg. The company also made the 60 hp engine for the Friso (1839) built by shipyard Vredenhof on the Kadijk. It also built the engine for the Amicitia built by Fop Smit Nieuw Lekkerland in 1846. It also built those of the steam yacht Rotterdam (1853), built by F. Smit in Kinderdijk for the service Rotterdam to 's-Hertogenbosch.

==== Iron ships ====
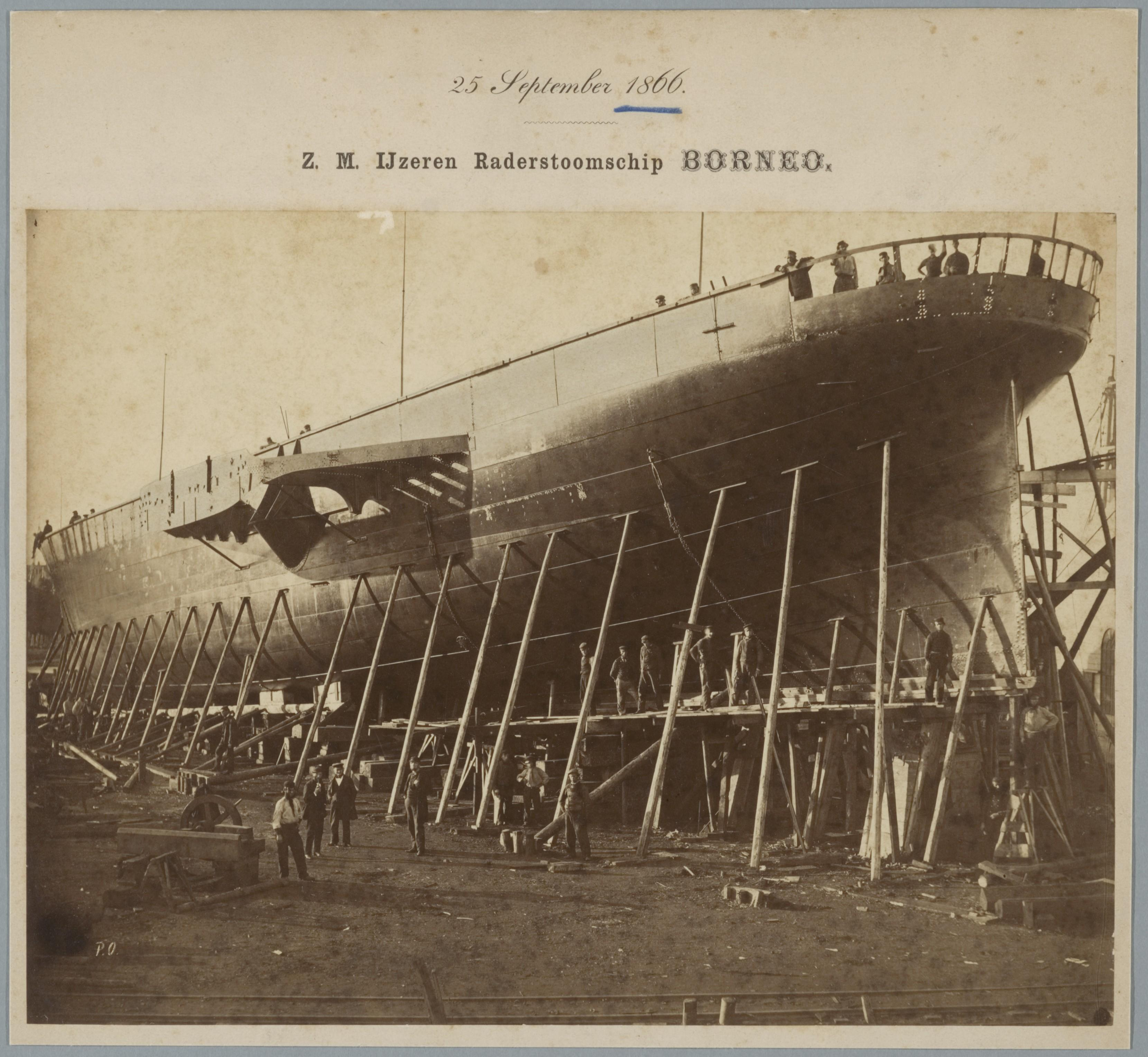
The steam paddle ship Borneo on the slipway at Oostenburg Sep. 1866

In Frankfurt a new company for steam transport between the Netherlands and as high upstream as the Main was founded in 1844. Van Vlissingen traveled to Frankfurt to compete for an order of iron steam vessels and lighters for steam service on the Rhine. He managed to secure an order for two tugboats and 16 lighters with a capacity of 4500 quintals for 450,000 guilders. For building these ships a shipyard was created on Oostenburg north of the factory, where the shipyard of the old Dutch East India Company had once stood. The company issued a tender for the construction of a wooden roof with walls of 130 by 20 meters.

Van Vlissingen next competed for an order from a newly founded steam tug service in Düsseldorf. By helping to raise capital for this company in Amsterdam, he also managed to secure this second order. The Düsseldorf order was for two tugboats and 10 lighters, amounting to 400,000 guilders. In September 1847 the Frankfurt company placed a new order of one tugboat of 200 hp, one tugboat of 100 hp and eight lighters. Similar orders would follow for steam navigation on the Po and for the Dutch East Indies. In these years many iron ships were built, but not many large steamships, apart from those were Van Vlissingen was also involved in the exploitation.

Some early ships built by Van Vlissingen en Dudok van Heel
Ship	Type	Launched	Length	Beam	Draught	Power	Notes
Main	Tugboat	31 May 1845					First tugboat built for the Frankfurt Company, steaming between Frankfurt and Biberich. Left the yard 24 August 1845.
Frankfurt	Tugboat	22 July 1845					Second tugboat built for the Frankfurt Company, steaming between Frankfurt and Biberich.
Nieder Rhein I	Tugboat	29 July 1846				200 hp	First tugboat for the Niederrheinische Dampfschleppschifffahrtsgesellschaft (Düsseldorf) Left Amsterdam 16 March 1847.
Pius IX	Tugboat	August 1847	150 feet	22 feet	60 cm	2 * 50 hp	Built for service on the Po. Assembled by Cornelis van Vlissingen in Venice March - August
Paul van Vlissingen	Tugboat	19 Jan 1848					For service between Amsterdam and the Upper Rhine by the Frankfurt Company.
Stoomvaart	Steam paddle ship	8 August 1848					For ASM line to Hamburg, the ninth steamship built.
4th Frankfurt tugboat	Tugboat	31 August 1848					For service on the Main by the Frankfurt Company.
Gouverneur van Ewijck	Screw steam ship	12 Nov 1848					For the Stoom Schroef Schooner Maatschappij, Van Vlissingen participated in exploitation
Burgemeester Huydecoper	Screw steam ship						For the Stoom Schroef Schooner Maatschappij, Van Vlissingen participated in exploitation
Archimedes	Screw steam ship	1849					For tug services at Nieuwediep
Henriette	Schooner ship	17 July 1851					First sail ship built at the shipyard First iron sea-going ship built in Amsterdam.
Eersteling	Screw steam ship	17 July 1851					For tug services on the Noordhollandsch Kanaal
Willem III	Steam ship	26 January 1852					For passenger service between Nijmegen and Arnhem
Prins van Oranje	Steam ship	24 June 1852					For service between Rotterdam and Dunkirk by the ASM under direction Paul van Vlissingen
Flevo	Steam ship	5 July 1852					For service between Amsterdam and Harlingen by the Friesche stoomboot-rederij
Hermine Marie Elisabeth	Barque	20 December 1852					220 Last (unit), for Joh. Bletz and S.A.C. Dudok van Heel.
Johannes van Hartevelde	Screw steam Ship	21 May 1853					Built for the line Rotterdam - Gent.
Henriette Geertruida	Barque	10 August 1853					200 last, laid down 20 December 1852
Düsseldorf No 3	Tugboat	8 September 1853				300 hp	
Vicenza	Tugboat	15 August 1853	160 feet	18 feet	2 feet 3 dm	100	Assembled in Venice by J.P. Dudok van Heel.
Tjitarum	Tugboat	20 July 1853	140 feet	20 feet			Assembled in Surabaya.
Paramaribo	Screw steamship	29 October 1853					Built for the ministry of the colonies.
Amsterdam	Iron Frigate	29 June 1854					For L. Bienfait en Zoon
Two tugboats built for Egypt	Tugboat	1855				150 hp	
Borneo	Steam paddle warship	26 Sep 1866	52.58 m	8.85 m	3.90 m	200 hp	For the department of the colonies, 1070t
Banka	Steam paddle warship	22 December 1866	52.58 m	8.85 m	3.90 m	200 hp	For the department of the colonies, 1070t

A breakthrough could have come from Belgium. In 1855 the steam ships Constitution and Belgique, 84.5 m long were launched.

==== Onrust Dock of 3,000 tons ====
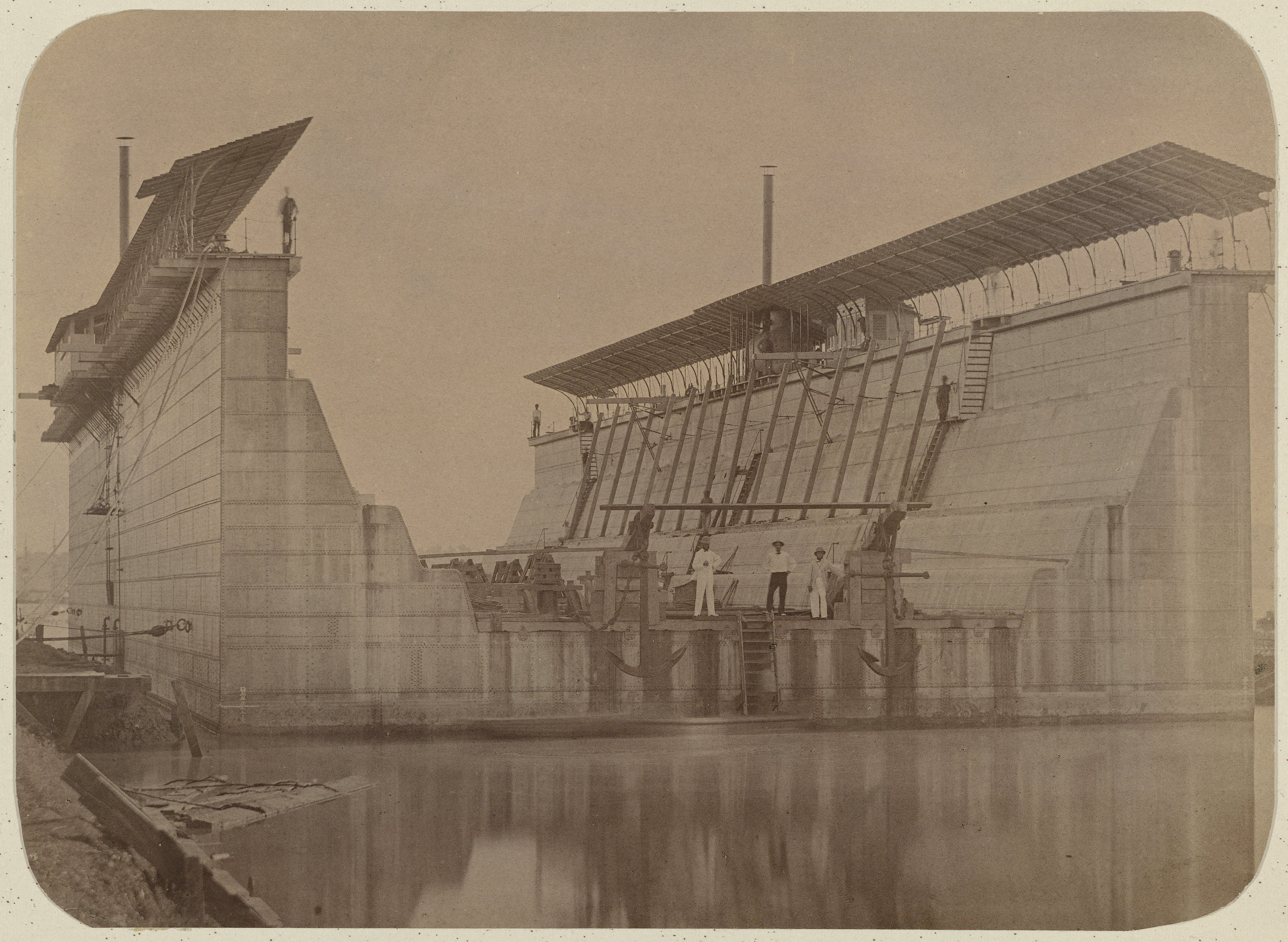
Floating iron dock at Onrust in 1877–1878

At first Onrust Dock of 3,000 tons was simply known as: 'The iron dry dock', because there was only one such structure in the Dutch East Indies made of iron. Before its construction, in the 1850s, there were only two floating dry docks in the Dutch East Indies, both made of wood. The admiralty in the Dutch East Indies wanted to have a third bigger floating dock. It foresaw that during the scheduled maintenance and repairs of the docks themselves, the remaining dock would not provide enough capacity to repair the screw powered ships, which also had a higher need for dry dock capacity. Furthermore, the existing dry docks were not capable of receiving the biggest ships. The Surabaya dock handled the Groningen-class corvettes of 1,780 tons with great difficulty. The wooden dock at Onrust Island was longer, but still not long enough, and was not capable to receive loaded ships.

On 3 February 1863, there was a public tender for the iron dock in the East Indies. It would be stationed at Onrust (island) near Batavia. Of 17 contestants Van Vlissingen en Dudok van Heel was the cheapest at 366,685 guilders. The floating dock was 90 m long, and up to 21 m wide on the inside. It would be able to load a screw frigate of 3,000 tons. On 9 June 1864 some members of the Royal Institute of Engineers visited the floating dock after attending their annual meeting. Van Vlissingen en Dudok van Heel made pictures and sent them to the members of the institute. The final cost of the floating dock would be 460,852 guilders, of those 41,018 were for transport. After transport to Surabaya the floating dry dock was re-assembled in a basin at Surabaya from 3 April 1865. In October 1869 it was finally towed to Onrust by the Amsterdam and Ardjoeno. It would have a remarkable long life, serving up to 1933.

==== Rolling Mill at Het Funen ====
In 1855 Paul van Vlissingen founded a separate company Van Vlissingen en Co.. Its goal was to found a Rolling (metalworking) mill. The work was to seize the opportunity offered by a tender for re-coining copper currency that circulated in the Dutch East Indies. It asked for melting and re-coining 3,000,000 pounds of copper coins. Van Vlissingen en Co. got two-thirds of the tender. A rolling mill was then erected at 'Het Funen', an area just east of the existing buildings. The rolling mill was 168 feet long and 118 feet wide. The machinery was made by Van Vlissingen en Dudok van Heel. There were 12 annealing and smelt ovens, and 5 pairs of rolls. In 1859 the re-coining operation had ended. The Rolling mill then got into deep trouble when it went to look for other work. The market for copper plate was in sharp decline because the shift to iron ships had reduced the demand for copper plate.

The company Van Vlissingen en Co. then seems to have been incorporated into Van Vlissingen & Dudok van Heel in 1866. The rolling mill was then re-equipped for rolling iron. In furnaces old iron and cast iron was made into Sheet metal. A Steam hammer of 1,200 kg then flattened the iron. It was cut up, made into slabs and finally rolled. In 24 hours 20,000 pounds of sheet metal could be produced. This iron rolling mill proved way to ambitious for the company. It made a loss of 3,000 guilders a week, and was immediately closed when the company was re-organized in 1870–1871.

==== The Moerdijk bridge ====
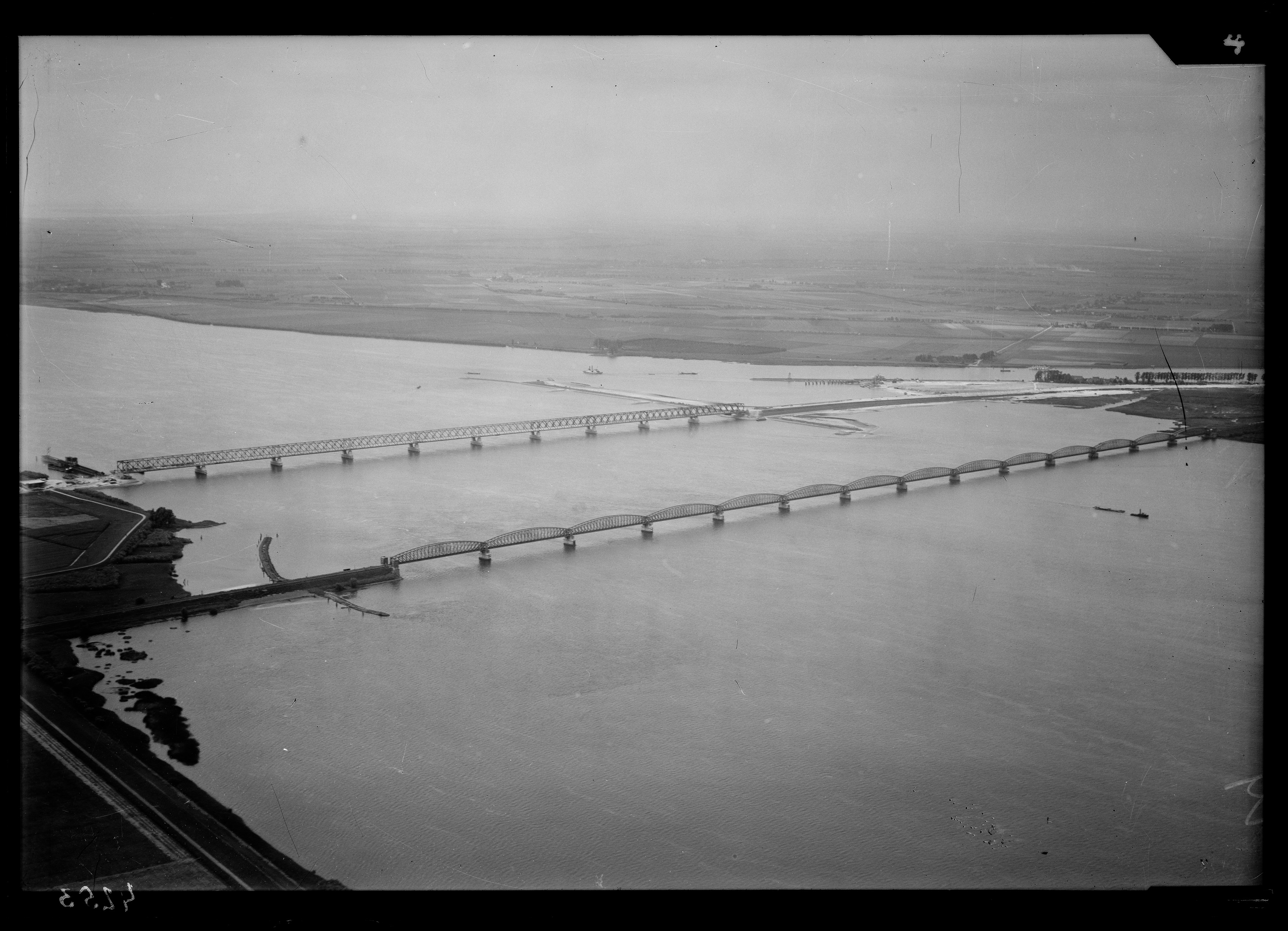
The first railway bridge (foreground) at the Moerdijk in 1936

Van Vlissingen & Dudok van Heel also made iron bridges. When it had incorporated the rolling mill in the late 1860s, its failure to win the tender for the railway bridge at Culemborg was a big setback.

In order to ensure work for the rolling mill, the company then made an offer that was way too low in order to be sure to get the contract for the gigantic bridge over the Hollands Diep The Moerdijk railway bridge was estimated at 2,350,000 guilders. The company made an offer of 1,466,740. It was so low that the minister asked whether a mistake had been made. The bridge required 6,500,000 kg of metal, the iron coming from Amsterdam, and the steel and some other parts from England. The company did think (or hope) that a clever engineering solution would make it possible to get the work done without loss, or perhaps only a small loss. In the end the bridge resulted in a loss of 225,695.97 guilders for the company. Apart from that, the engineering was impressive. The bridge was the longest in Europe and was opened on 1 January 1872, four months before the required date.

=== Crisis of 1870 ===
The affairs of the Moerdijk bridge, the rolling mill and other bad deals had led to many losses. In order to solve the problems, the capital of the company was increased by a staggering 500,000 guilders in June 1870. The last installment of this sum was to be paid on 24 September 1870. On 30 September 1870 the company then asked for an automatic stay so it would get time to reorganize its financial position, a step that led to wide disbelief and indignation.

The reasons that the management gave for the automatic stay were that many credit lines had been terminated, and payments had failed to come in because of the Franco-Prussian War. Furthermore that employees had been drafted. The resulting delays in the construction of the Stella for the KNSM had led to missing 135,000 guilders in payment terms. (The loss on the Stella was later estimated at 68,414.) However, the root causes of the troubles were three. In order to generate more profits for the partners the company consistently worked with a capital that was far too small. A second root cause was the bad financial management of the company, that led to a lack of transparency in the (financial) situation. The consistent payment of a high dividend of c. 8% was a third root cause. The automatic stay was granted by the court, and M.J. Pijnappel (lawyer), C. van der Vliet (creditor) and the famous engineer B.J. Tideman were appointed as administrators.

== Koninklijke Fabriek van Stoom- en andere Werktuigen ==
=== The public company Koninklijke Fabriek van Stoom- en andere Werktuigen is founded ===
In mid October 1870 a meeting of the limited partners of the company was held. In this meeting the supervisory board declared that it had promoted the recent 500,000 guilders increase of capital in June, because it had been misled about 250,000 guilders being temporarily used for other purposes, and multiple tons of gold (100,000 guilders) in debts had been concealed from them. General partner Van Vlissingen declared that both general partners were guilty of the many errors which had brought the company in its current position. Furthermore that they were prepared to renounce their privileged position and to cooperate in a reform of the limited partnership to a Naamloze vennootschap, a public company. The meeting then appointed a committee of reorganization that would attempt to restructure the company as a public company.

In a meeting on 20 January 1871 the committee of reorganization made its report: All preferential creditors, and most of the normal creditors had agreed to their plans. 3 Creditors for a debt of 125,000 (out of the total debt of 1,250,000) refused to agree. The proposed settlement would consist of 40% payment in money, and 60% in 37-year bonds paying 3%, and later 5%. The commission had already found 300,000 guilders for securities, but did not want to proceed till all creditors agreed. The commission was then persuaded to continue for 3 more weeks in order to get the refusing creditors on board.

In a 10 February 1871 meeting of the limited partners the committee of reorganization announced that the three refusing creditors had agreed to the proposals. Intervention by other creditors had led to this success. The commission then went to work on raising a short term credit of 200,000 guilders protected by special securities. On 26 March 1871 the limited partners agreed to the final reorganization plan. The existing limited partnership was disbanded and all assets transferred to a new public company. This public company came under the direction of Johannes Marinus van der Made and was founded on 5 April. The government approval for the new public company came in a few weeks later. The new public company was allowed to retain the name Koninklijke Fabriek van Stoom- en andere Werktuigen, and this now came in general use.

=== Timeline of the Koninklijke Fabriek ===
When the new company was founded it was also tasked with handling the affairs of the previous limited partnership. The work in progress was:

- Machinery, boilers etc. for the navy 470,000 guilders
- One steam paddle ship engine 16,000 guilders
- Two Sugar beet factories 227,000 guilders
- Lock gates for the Oranje Locks 133,000 guilders
- Steamship engine for the Guinea 45,000 guilders
- Moerdijk Bridges 1,466,000 guilders

The new company probably got more confidence from principals. From 7 April till 31 December 1871 it got new orders for 1,280,205 guilders. At the end of 1872 the company had 1,300 employees, 300 more than the year before, but rising prices and labor cost significantly diminished the profit. In 1873 the company contracted for 2,055,340 guilders. In 1875 the company had 1,200 employees. In 1877 the number of employees was 1,700.

The Koninklijke Fabriek began to lose business in the 1880s. In 1880 the number of employees went down from 1,500 to 1,000. In 1881 it went down to 700. It seemed as if principals had lost confidence in the company. In 1882–1883 there was a revival when big ships were ordered. It led to costly investments in four slipways with foundations of 100 m long each, as well as investments in machinery. The number of employees temporarily rose to 1,800. These investments that drained the working capital of the company would be the cause of its fall some years later. In 1884 the board proposed to end the company because no new capital was found. That same year the Indian Sugar crisis hit the company and the number of employees fell to 600, the expensive shipyard was closed down. In 1885 the shipyard was reopened after a tender for a small floating dock of 1,400 ton was won. It did not help, because the company continued to lose money on many projects. In 1885 the loss was 223,925 guilders, in 1888 424,818 guilders and so consecutive losses steadily brought the company to its knees. In 1889 there was a last revival in activity, when the company employed 1,600 men, but it again led to heavy losses.

=== Activities of the Koninklijke Fabriek ===
==== Ships ====
One of the first orders from the navy (i.e. minister for the colonies) was for three steam screw gunboats. The Koninklijke Fabriek also got a lot of orders from the Dutch navy. In 1875 it delivered the paddle steamer Bromo. In 1876 the gunboats Fred and Das. In 1882 the Stoomvaart Maatschappij Insulinde ordered two big ships. In 1883 the Koninklijke West Indische Maildienst ordered three big ships. Later the company built the monitor Reinier Claeszen, laid down in 1890. It also started the construction of HNLMS Koningin Wilhelmina der Nederlanden. After the collapse of the company, she was towed to the Rijkswerf in order to be finished there.

Some ships built by the Koninklijke Fabriek van Stoom- en andere Werktuigen
Name	Type	Laid Down	Launched	Displ.	Tonnage	Power	Notes
Amboina	Screw steam ship		21 January 1873	695t		80 nhp	Composite built. For the colonial ministry
Deli	Screw steam ship		10 April 1873	695t		80 nhp	Composite built. For the colonial ministry
Pontianak	Screw steam ship		20 December 1873	732t		90 nhp	For the colonial ministry
Bandjermasing	Screw steam ship		7 March 1874	732t		90 nhp	For the colonial ministry
Bromo	Steam paddle ship		22 September 1874	1,524t		200 nhp	For the colonial ministry
HNLMS Sumatra (1890)	Protected Cruiser		1890	1693t		2,350 ihp	

==== Ship engines ====
In 1875 the company delivered the engine for the sloop Alkmaar. In 1876 the company delivered the 2,700 hp engines for the Atjeh. The company also made the machines for the monitor HNLMS Draak launched in 1877.

==== Rolling stock ====
One of the first actions of the Koninklijke Fabriek was the shutdown of the rolling mill at het Funen on 5 May 1871. The place was used to found a factory for making railroad cars. It almost immediately got orders from the Hanover state railways for 80 cargo cars. Soon followed by 350 cars (of which only 105 would be delivered) for the Boxtel - Wesel line. Soon 300 employees were involved in making cargo cars. In 1875 about 100 cars were sold to the Nederlandsche Rhijnspoorweg Maatschappij.

==== Bridges ====
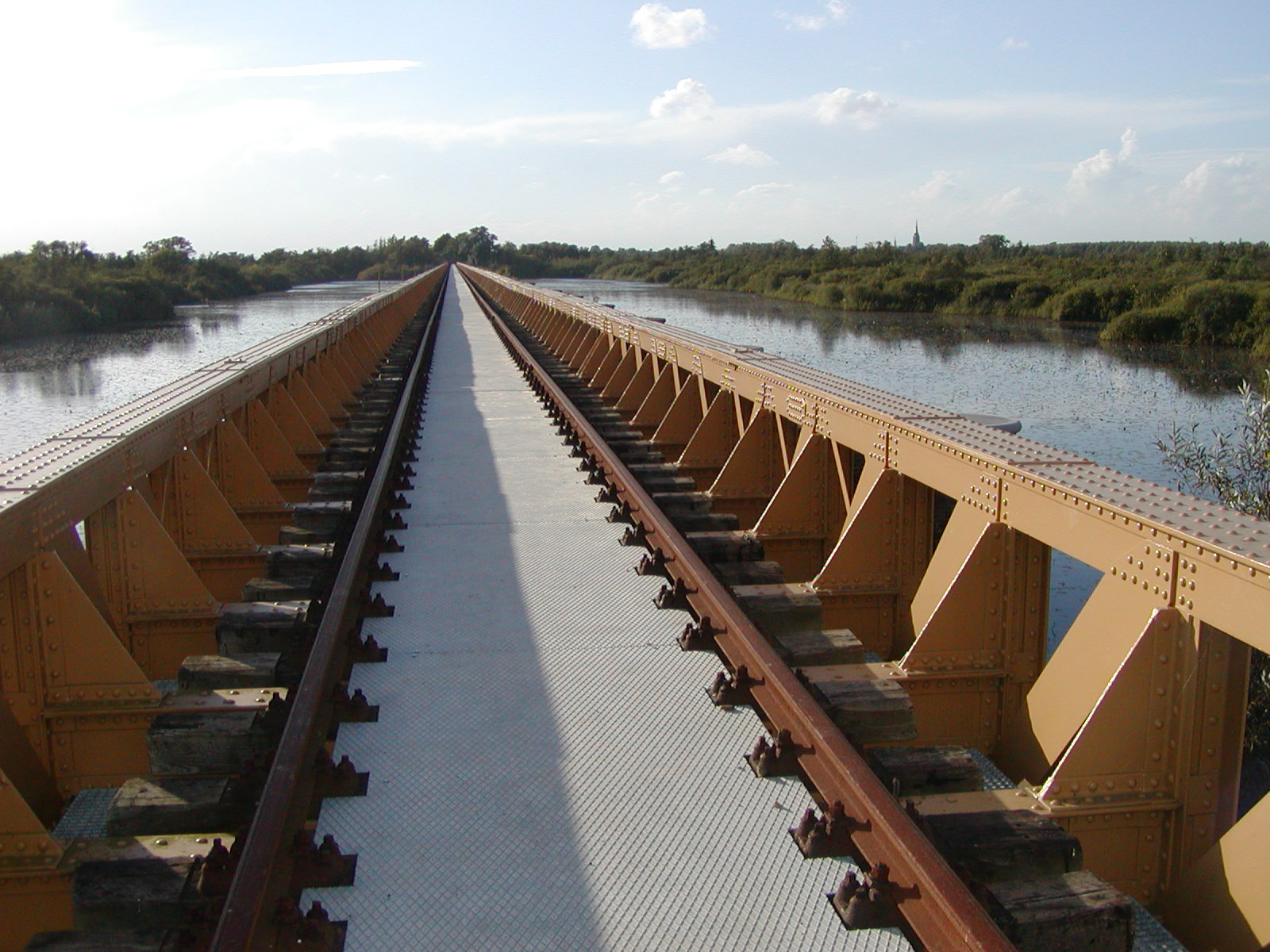
Moerputtenbrug in 2006

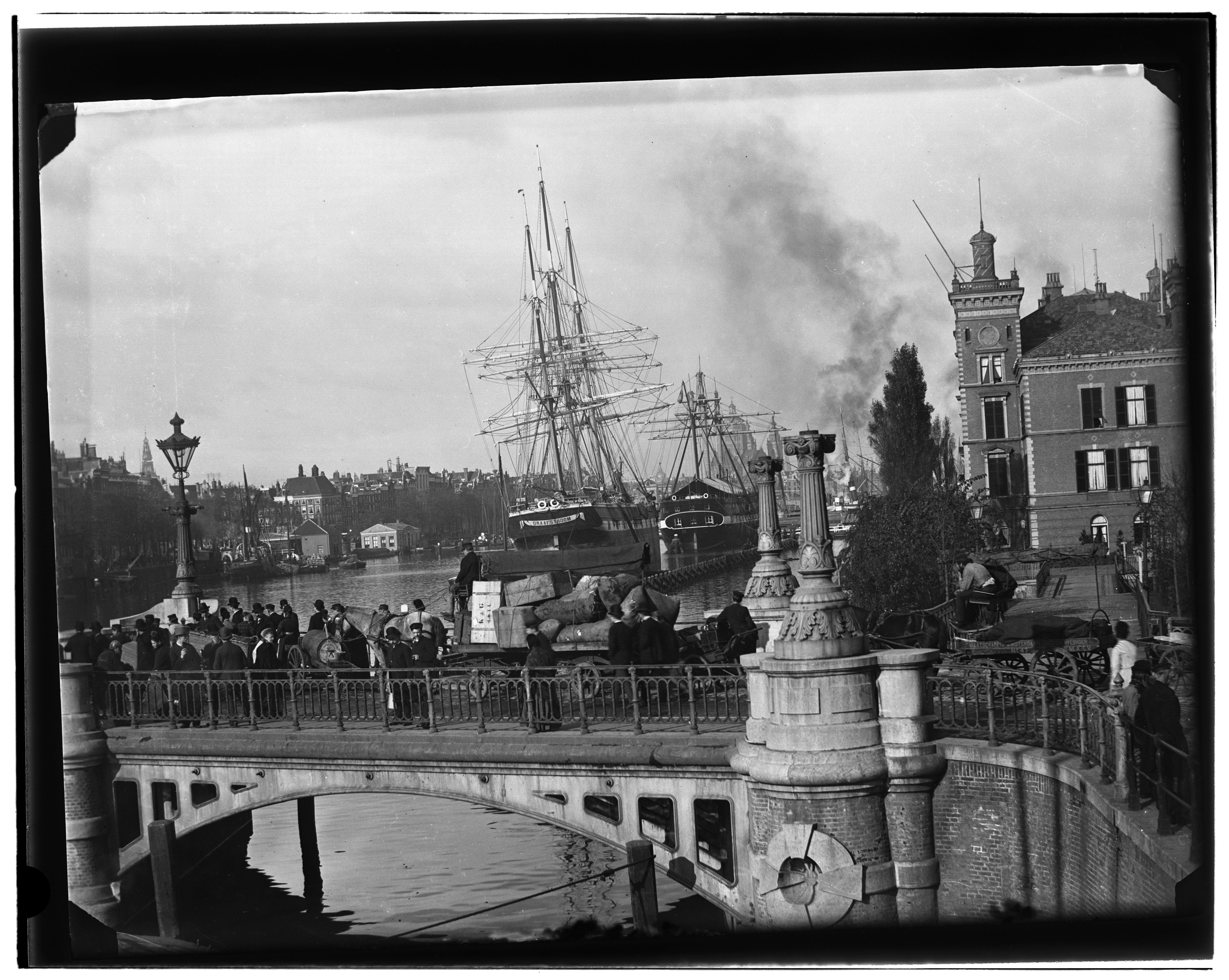
Kattenburgerbrug in 1890

In 1873 the company delivered the railway bridge over the Meuse at Ravenstein for 396,000 guilders. In 1874 the company lost a tender for the construction of the first Willemsbrug over the Meuse in Rotterdam when it offered for 970,000 guilders. Société J. F. Cail & Cie from Paris offered for 872,000 guilders, and there were more lower offers. The labor union Velen en toch één then protested against giving the work to Caile & Co because it suspected that it consciously took the work at a loss in order to keep the factory going. In November 1874 the company then lost a tender for a bridge between the Wijnstraat and Boerenvischmarkt in Rotterdam to Cockerill which offered for 473,460 guilders with the Koninklijke Fabriek the highest at 584,000 guilders.

In 1875 the Koninklijke Fabriek came out highest at a tender for two bridges over the harbor front in Amsterdam. The factory offered for 512,000 guilders, while the lowest offer was for 409,000 by Kölnische Maschinenbau. Six other competitors also offered lower. In November 1875 the company lost a tender for the bridge over the Waal at Nijmegen. At 1,529,200 guilders it lost to Union AG für Bergbau und Hüttenbetrieb from Oberhausen, which offered for 1,440,000 guilders. In 1876 the company delivered the comparatively small Kattenburgerbrug over the Nieuwe Vaart near the factory in Amsterdam.

In 1882 the government helped the company somewhat by ordering 91 bridges for the railroad from Lage Zwaluwe to 's-Hertogenbosch for 537,000 guilders even though the competition offered for 2,000 less. The order included the 585 m long Moerputten Bridge, which has been preserved as a pedestrian bridge. The order led to big losses for the company.

==== Floating docks ====
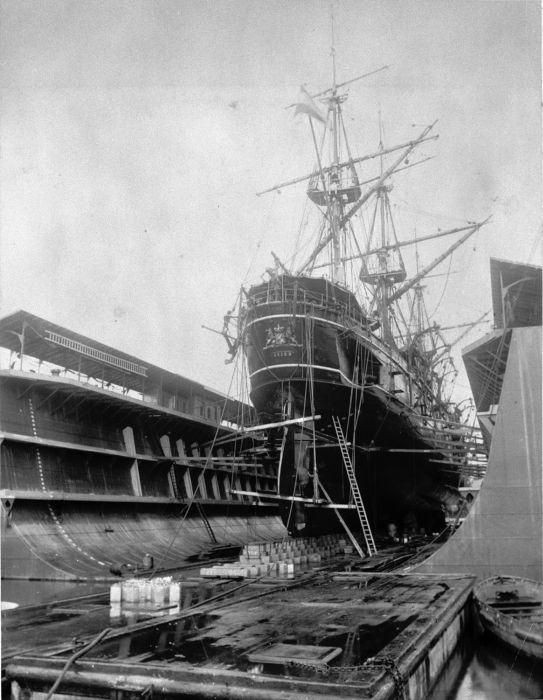
The unprotected cruiser Atjeh in the 5000 ton drydock between 1877 and 1892

In 1876 the Koninklijke Fabriek won the tender for a new floating dock of 5000 tons for the East Indies. It was to be 100 m long, 27 m wide, 12 m high on the inside. It was estimated to require 2,600,000 kg of iron, and was estimated to cost 969,000 guilders for the iron work alone. The company won the tender for a price of 781,000 guilders. In 1879 the first parts of the dry dock arrived at Surabaya. On 14 December 1879 the drydock had been assembled. The dock would be able to load 4,800 tons and would be ready to be launched in June 1880. In October 1880 the drydock arrived at Onrust Island, where many ships would use it.

In 1885 the company won a tender for a small floating dock of 1,400 tons. It was delivered in 1886 and transported to Surabaya.

=== End of the Koninklijke Fabriek ===
In early 1890 the Koninklijke Fabriek was in serious trouble. On 19 March 1890 the board announced that it would not make any new commitments, and that it would ask for an automatic stay. While it superficially looked like the crisis of 1871, this crises was different. The 1871 crisis was an acute crisis, the current problems were chronic. The company was steadily burning money, and as long as nobody knew how to fix it, a mere financial reconstruction was not possible. The Koninklijke Fabriek would get two big successors: Werkspoor and NSM.

== Successors of the Koninklijke Fabriek ==
=== Werkspoor ===
Part of the machine factory and the factory for rolling stock would be continued as Nederlandsche Fabriek van Werktuigen en spoorwegmaterieel. In 1927 this was officially renamed Werkspoor.

=== NSM (Ships) ===
When the Koninklijke Fabriek was restarted to later become Werkspoor, the shipbuilding activities were stopped. In 1893 former employees of the Koninklijke Fabriek then contacted Jacob Theodoor Cremer, and he founded the Nederlandsche Scheepsbouw Maatschappij (NSM) (literally: The Dutch shipbuilding company), a name that would later prove not to be an exaggeration. It used the terrain of the former shipyard of the Koninklijke Fabriek, but not the terrain of the engine factory, which was continued by Koninklijke Fabriek. Using the grounds and the former employees of the Koninklijke Fabriek, the NSM was a successor of the Koninklijke Fabriek, albeit only from an organizational perspective.
