= SS Prins Hendrik =

SS Prins Hendrik is the name of the following ships:

- SS Prins Hendrik (1871)
- SS Prins Hendrik (1874)

== See also ==
- Prins Hendrik (disambiguation)
