= SS Koning der Nederlanden =

Dutch ocean liner (1872-1881)

Coordinates: 5°14′S 64°7′E

Koning der Nederlanden
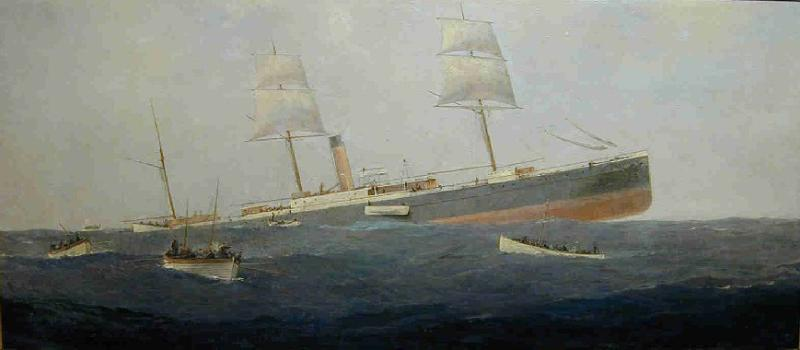

History

Netherlands
- Namesake: King of the Netherlands
- Operator: Netherland Line
- Port of registry: Amsterdam
- Builder: John Elder & Company at Govan
- Launched: 5 September 1872
- Fate: Sank 5 October 1881

General characteristics
- Type: Passenger ship
- Tonnage: 3,063 GRT
- Length: 107.3 meters (352 ft)
- Beam: 12 meters (39 ft)
- Draft: 6.5 meters (21 ft)
- Propulsion: Compound steam engine
- Speed: 10 knots (19 km/h; 12 mph)

SS Koning der Nederlanden was a Dutch ocean liner of the Netherland Line. She served from 1872 until her sinking in 1881 in the Indian Ocean while en route from Batavia to Amsterdam. Three of her lifeboats, with a total of 90 passengers and crew, were never found.

The 3063-ton steamship Koning der Nederlanden was built in Scotland at the John Elder & Company shipyard in Govan. The ship was launched on September 5, 1872 and proceeded on her maiden voyage. The iron hull was 107.3 meters (352 ft) long,12 meters (39 ft) wide, and had a maximum draft of 6.5 metres (21 ft). The two-cylinder compound steam engines had a single screw, and provided a cruising speed of 20 knots (37 km/h; 23 mph).

SS Koning der Nederlanden (King of the Netherlands) helped move passengers, freight and mail between Amsterdam and the Dutch East Indies. She was built for the Netherlands Steamship Company. The company's ships maintained regular passenger and freight traffic between the Netherlands and the Dutch East Indies. They had a trademark chimney design, with a black band on top of a yellow-brown funnel.

On Tuesday 4 October 1881, the ship's drive shaft broke in the middle of the Indian Ocean, while on the way from Batavia to Amsterdam, allowing water into the vessel. Upon the sea water flooding the engine room, Captain Bruyns ordered an evacuation of the ship. All 216 passengers and crew members left the ship. The ship began to sink slowly, and sank by the stern on the following day, 5 October. The closest island was Diego Garcia in the Chagos Archipelago, 400 nautical miles (740 km; 460 mi) away. Of the six lifeboats launched from the steamship, three were found and rescued, but the remaining three boats, with a total of 90 passengers and crew, disappeared without trace.

At that time screw propulsion was already recognized as more efficient than paddle propulsion, but the construction of long drive shafts that were strong and yet flexible was still problematic.
