= SS Jan Pieterszoon Coen =

Dutch passenger ship named after a former Governor-General of the Dutch East Indies

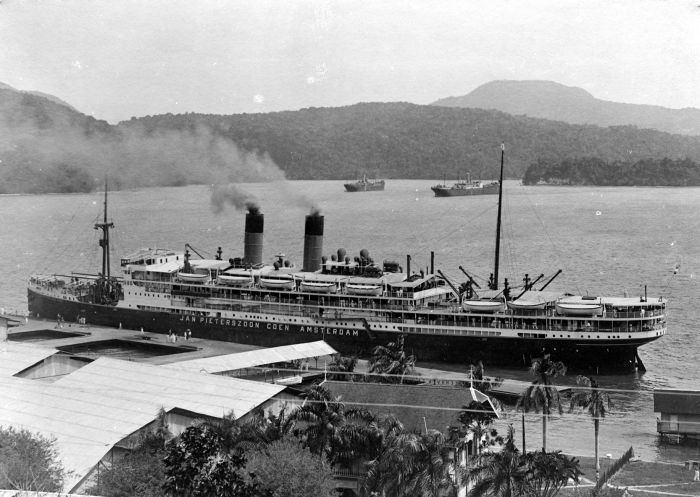
- Jan Pieterszoon Coen in Sabang, about 1935

History

Netherlands
- Name: Jan Pieterszoon Coen
- Namesake: Jan Pieterszoon Coen
- Owner: SM 'Nederland'
- Port of registry: Amsterdam
- Route: Amsterdam – Batavia
- Ordered: 27 December 1912
- Builder: Nederlandsche Scheepsbouw Mij, Amsterdam
- Cost: 3,720,423 guilders
- Yard number: 130
- Laid down: 14 October 1913
- Launched: 30 September 1914
- Completed: 17 June 1915
- Acquired: 17 June 1915
- Maiden voyage: 11 September 1915
- In service: 11 September 1915
- Out of service: 14 May 1940
- Identification: code letters PDKB (until 1933); call sign PFL (by 1918); call sign PEZP (1934 onward)
- Fate: Scuttled in 1940; scrapped in 1945 & 1968

General characteristics
- Type: Passenger ship
- Tonnage: 11,693 GRT, 7,107 NRT, 6,950 DWT
- Displacement: 15,600 tons
- Length: 522.5 ft (159.26 m) overall; 503.2 ft (153.4 m) registered
- Beam: 60.5 ft (18.4 m)
- Draft: 26 ft 3 in (8.00 m)
- Depth: 35.8 ft (10.9 m) molded to shelter deck
- Decks: 7, 3 full length, and a shelter deck
- Installed power: 1,364 NHP, 7,400 ihp
- Propulsion: 2 × screws; 2 × triple expansion engines
- Speed: 15 kn (28 km/h)
- Capacity: Passengers, as built: 202 × 1st Class, 129 × 2nd Class, 46 × 3rd Class, 42 × Steerage; Cargo: 350,000 cu ft (9,900 m^{3}) grain; 300,000 cu ft (8,500 m^{3}) bale
- Crew: 161
- Sensors & processing systems: as built: submarine signalling; by 1930: wireless direction finding

SS Jan Pieterszoon Coen was a Dutch passenger steamship that was launched in 1914. She was named after a former Governor-General of the Dutch East Indies. During the German invasion of the Netherlands in May 1940 she was scuttled as a blockship in the port of IJmuiden, North Holland to prevent the Kriegsmarine from using the port.

== Building ==
Stoomvaart Maatschappij Nederland ordered the ship on 27 December 1912. She was laid down on 14 October 1913 at the Nederlandsche Scheepsbouw Maatschappij shipyard in Amsterdam, Netherlands. Coen was planned to be christened by Mrs. den Tex on 30 September 1914, but half an hour before this was to happen, Coen left the slipway on her own.

Construction of Coen continued while she was in the water. On 20 May 1915, she left the shipyard to continue construction on the IJ. This move included the narrow passage of the Oosterdok Lock. After she had been carefully pulled through, she was taken into Juliana Drydock at 4 AM on the 21st. Coen was completed and acquired on 17 June 1915. Coen made her maiden voyage on 11 September 1915.

The ship's lengths were 522.5 feet (159.26 m) long overall and 503.2 ft (153.4 m) registered. Her beam was 60.5 ft (18.4 m) and her depth was 35.8 ft (10.9 m), molded to her shelter deck. Her tonnages were 11,693 GRT, 7,107 NRT and 6,950 DWT, and 12,600 tons displacement. The ship had seven decks, three continuous the full length of the ship, with a shelter deck. Eight watertight bulkheads divided the ship into nine watertight compartments with ten watertight doors capable of being closed remotely from the bridge.

Eight single ended forced draft Scotch boilers with two furnaces each provided steam for two three-cylinder triple expansion steam engines driving twin screw propellers. The combined power of the twin engines was rated at 1,364 NHP or 7,400 ihp. Boilers and engines were manufactured by Nederlandsche Fabriek van Werktuigen and SpoorwegMaterieel, Amsterdam. The ship was electrically lit throughout with some electrical auxiliaries including one steering engine, another being steam driven as were the cargo working winches.

As built, the ship had accommodation for 202 first class passengers in 107 cabins and four suites, 128 second class passengers in 49 cabins, 46 third class passengers in 16 cabins and 42 fourth class passengers. First class passengers had access to a deck saloon, a verandah cafe, smoking room, nursery, gymnasium, photographic dark room and a 138-seat dining saloon. The crew was 161.

Navigation and safety equipment included wireless telegraphy and submarine signals (Note: Lloyd's Register notes the presence of submarine signal equipment with the abbreviation "sub. sig." under the ship's name. An early description of the system is given at "How Underwater Signals Operate" (The Marine Review, February 1920).) and fourteen lifeboats, two powered, enough for all persons aboard. By 1918 her wireless call sign was PFL. By 1930 she also had wireless direction finding. By 1934 the four-letter call sign PEZP had superseded both her code letters and her three-letter call sign.

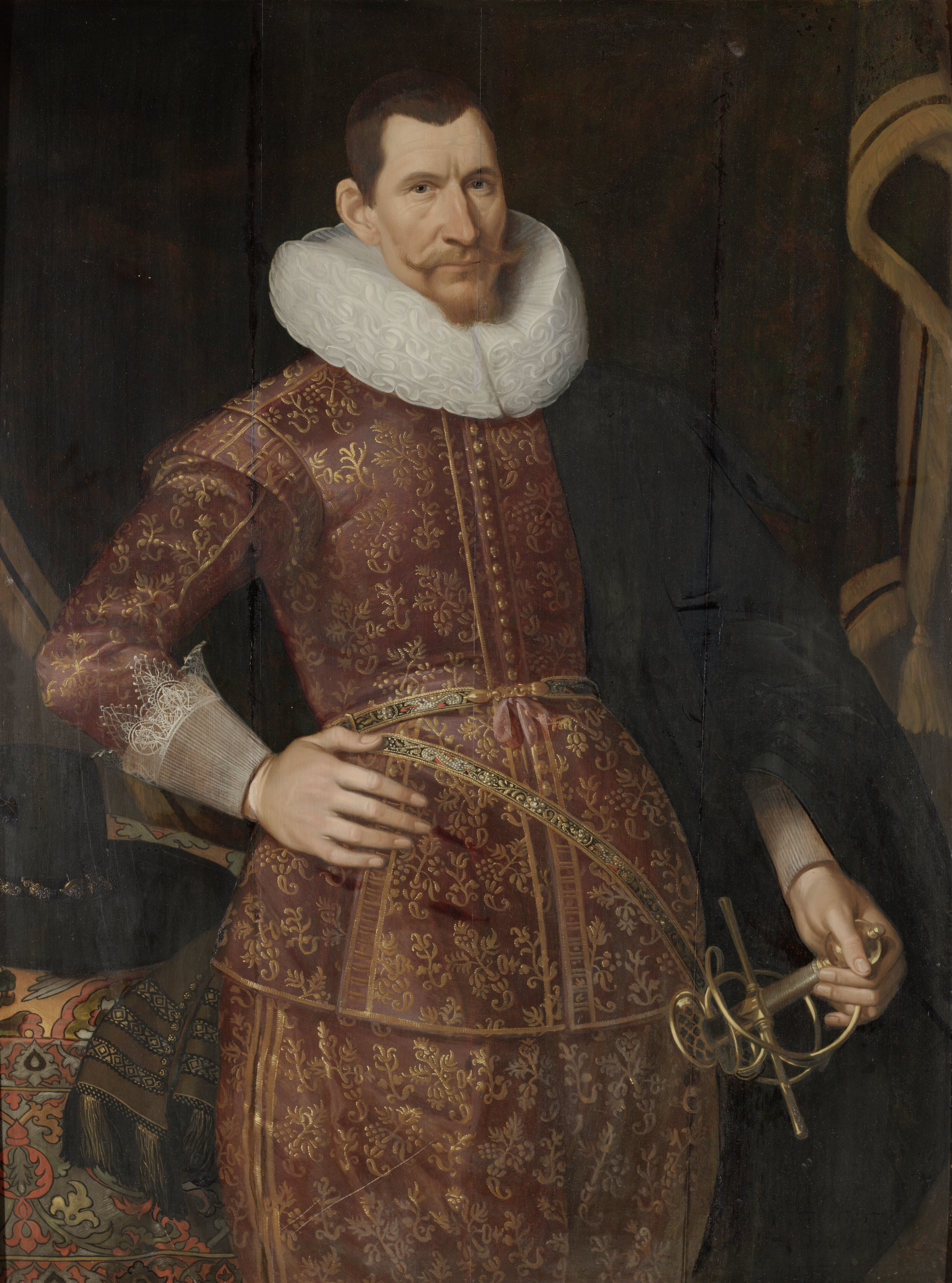
The ship was named after Governor-General Jan Pieterszoon Coen (1587–1629)

== Early career ==
=== Sea trials ===
After being completed in June 1915, Jan Pieterszoon Coen became the new flagship of the Stoomvaart Maatschappij Nederland, and was also the largest ship ever to be built in the Netherlands at the time. She completed her sea trials in IJmuiden in June 1915 with several passengers aboard, including the company's president J.B.A Jonckheer, four ministers with their spouses, the Mayor of Amsterdam with his spouse and two law enforcers. There were also a high number of officials, important business relation officials and the supervisory boards and the boards of shipyard and shipping company of the SMN.

The ship's Master at the time was Captain H.G.J Uylkens who led the ship to open seas together with the tugboat Cycloop van Zurmülen. The ship sailed South past Zandvoort, Katwijk, Noordwijk and Scheveningen. During lunch however, a submarine was spotted by the guests and crew. Everyone became worried at first, but it was soon clear that it was a Dutch submarine that was given orders to guide Jan Pieterszoon Coen back to IJmuiden. The ship completed her sea trials and arrived back in IJmuiden without incident.

=== Active service ===
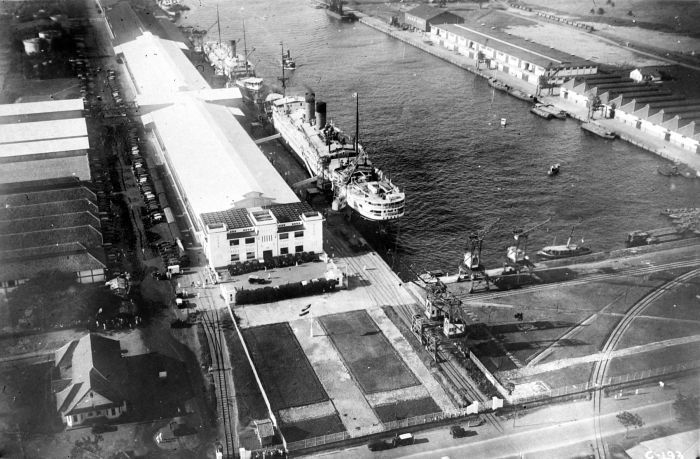
Jan Pieterszoon Coen docked in Batavia, about 1937

On 11 September 1915 at 3pm, Jan Pieterszoon Coen left Amsterdam, Netherlands for her maiden voyage to Batavia, Dutch East Indies. She sailed through the Mediterranean Sea and the Suez Canal to reach her destination.

Jan Pieterszoon Coen left Amsterdam for Batavia again on 1 Januari 1916, but this time she would sail around Cape of Good Hope and Cape Town to reach Batavia. She arrived on 17 February 1916 before returning to the Netherlands, where she arrived on 6 May. After the war, the ship would continue to sail the Amsterdam – Batavia route.

== Later service and end ==
Jan Pieterszoon Coen left Batavia for the last time on 28 June 1939 and was stationed in Amsterdam on 29 July 1939 where she was waiting to be scrapped. However, due to the outbreak of the Second World War, the ship was needed again and she made two short voyages to Lisbon, Portugal, in order to retrieve passengers from the MS Oranje.

When the German Army invaded the Netherlands in May 1940, the Royal Netherlands Navy made a plan which involved scuttling Jan Pieterszoon Coen at the entrance of the port of IJmuiden in order to prevent German warships entering the harbor. The plan was set in motion in the night of 14 May 1940, Captain R. van Rees Vellinga sailed Jan Pieterszoon Coen from Amsterdam to IJmuiden. Once there, the ship was supposed to be escorted to the harbor entrance by two tugboats, but they were accidentally sunk too early. As a solution to the problem, The Royal Netherlands Navy ordered the tugboat Atjeh and a minesweeper to tow the ship into place. The tugboat and minesweeper towed the ship into place with much difficulty due to the tide change. The ship was positioned with the bow to the Southern pier and the stern to the Northern pier of the port entrance. The explosives which were previously installed on the ship were detonated and the ship sank between the piers. Her upper decks were still sticking out of the water due to the shallow depths. The plan was successful and the ship prohibited German ships to enter the harbor, the Netherlands however surrendered to the Axis powers and was occupied by Nazi-Germany.

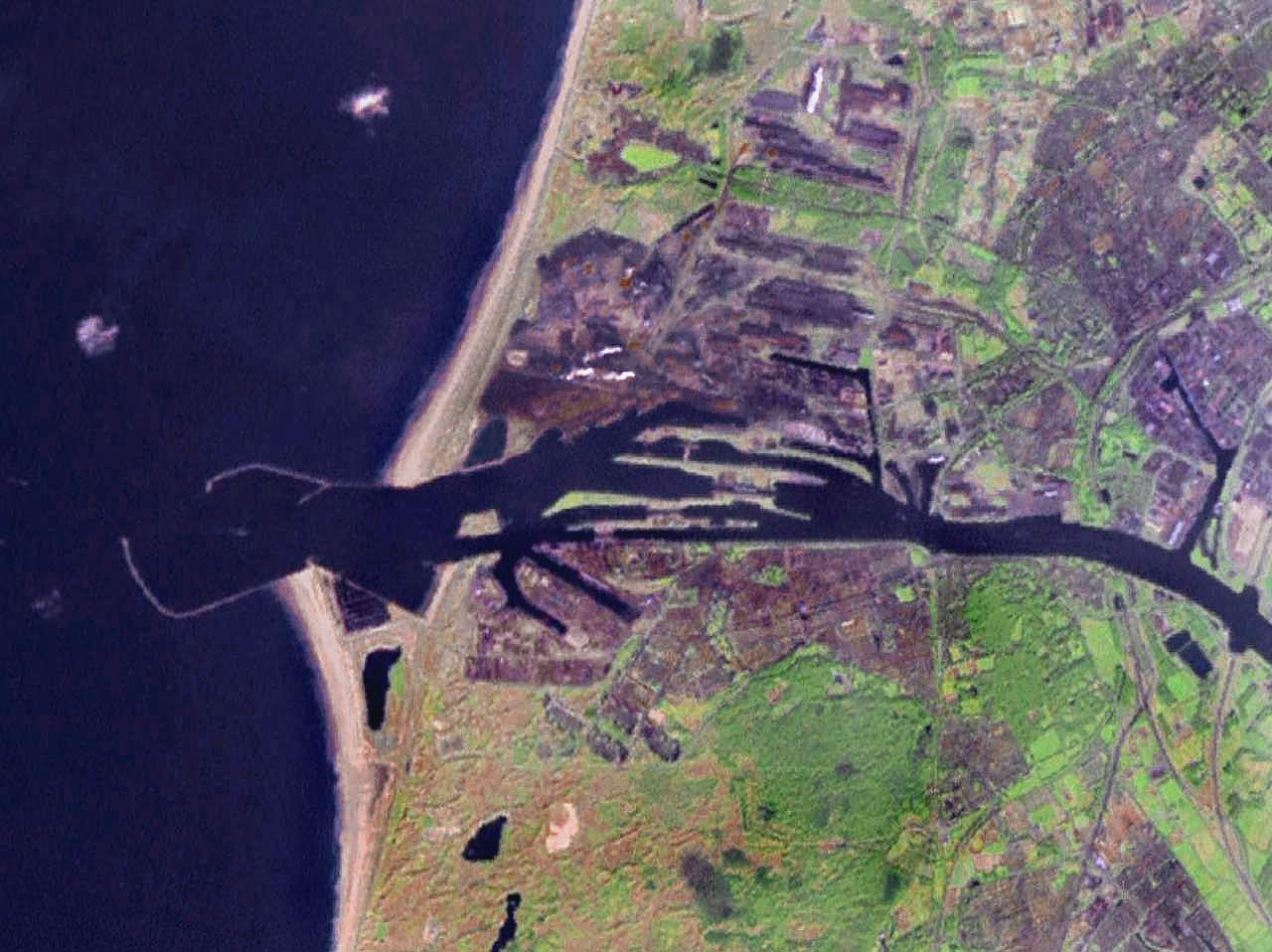
Modern day view of the port entrance of IJmuiden, the piers are clearly visible on the left

== Wreck ==
The German Army emptied the ship of movable property during 1940, they could do this because the ship was mostly above water. Rijkswaterstaat was thinking of salvaging Jan Pieterszoon Coen, since the ship was mostly intact and in shallow waters. But due to a series of storms, the ship sank deeper into the sand. In 1941, a 50-meter portion of the stern was removed so largeships could use the harbor again.

During the remainder of the war, Jan Pieterszoon Coen sank deeper into the sea and her upper decks were severely damaged and deteriorated by the strong waves that constantly pounded her. The funnels and some decks had also collapsed during this period. After the war in May and June 1945, the Royal Netherlands Navy with help from the Royal Navy, destroyed what was left of the ship with depth charges. However, a lot of debris was left in the entrance and the Dutch government was forced to clean up the debris from the bottom of the sea in 1968 so that larger ships could use the harbor.
