= Netherland Line =

Transport company in Netherlands

- House flag

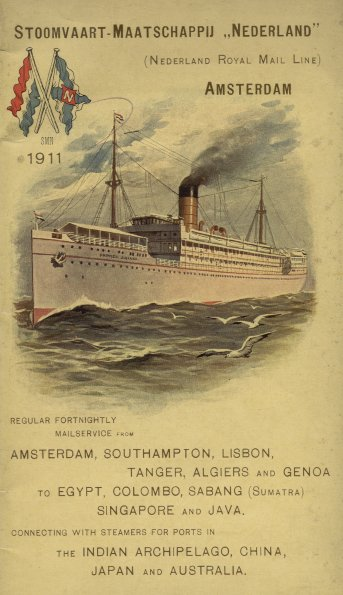
- Company poster from 1911
- Industry: Shipping
- Founded: 13 May 1870
- Defunct: 1970
- Fate: Merged into Nedlloyd
- Headquarters: Amsterdam, Netherlands
- Services: Passengers, freight
- Parent: Nederlandsche Scheepvaart Unie

Stoomvaart Maatschappij Nederland ("Netherlands Steamship Company") or SMN, also known as the Netherland Line or Nederland Line, was a Dutch shipping line that operated from 1870 until 1970, when it merged with several other companies to form what would become Royal Nedlloyd. (Note: Nedlloyd itself later merged with Peninsular and Oriental Steam Navigation Company (P&O) to become P&O Nedlloyd, now a part of Maersk.)

The company's motto, Semper Mare Navigandum ("Always sail the seas"), conveniently fitted the same initials.

== Foundation ==
=== Introduction ===
The SMN was founded on May 13, 1870, in Amsterdam for the trade between North Western Europe and the former Dutch East Indies (modern Indonesia) via the newly opened Suez Canal. Construction of the Suez Canal had started on 25 April 1859. Together with the development of steam engines with lower coal consumption (the compound engine), the realization of a suitable canal would make sailing ships obsolete on the passage to the East Indies. Of course many had a wait and see attitude towards the canal, but when it was nearing completion in 1869, it became clear that something had to be done.

=== Park meeting and commission to found the SMN ===
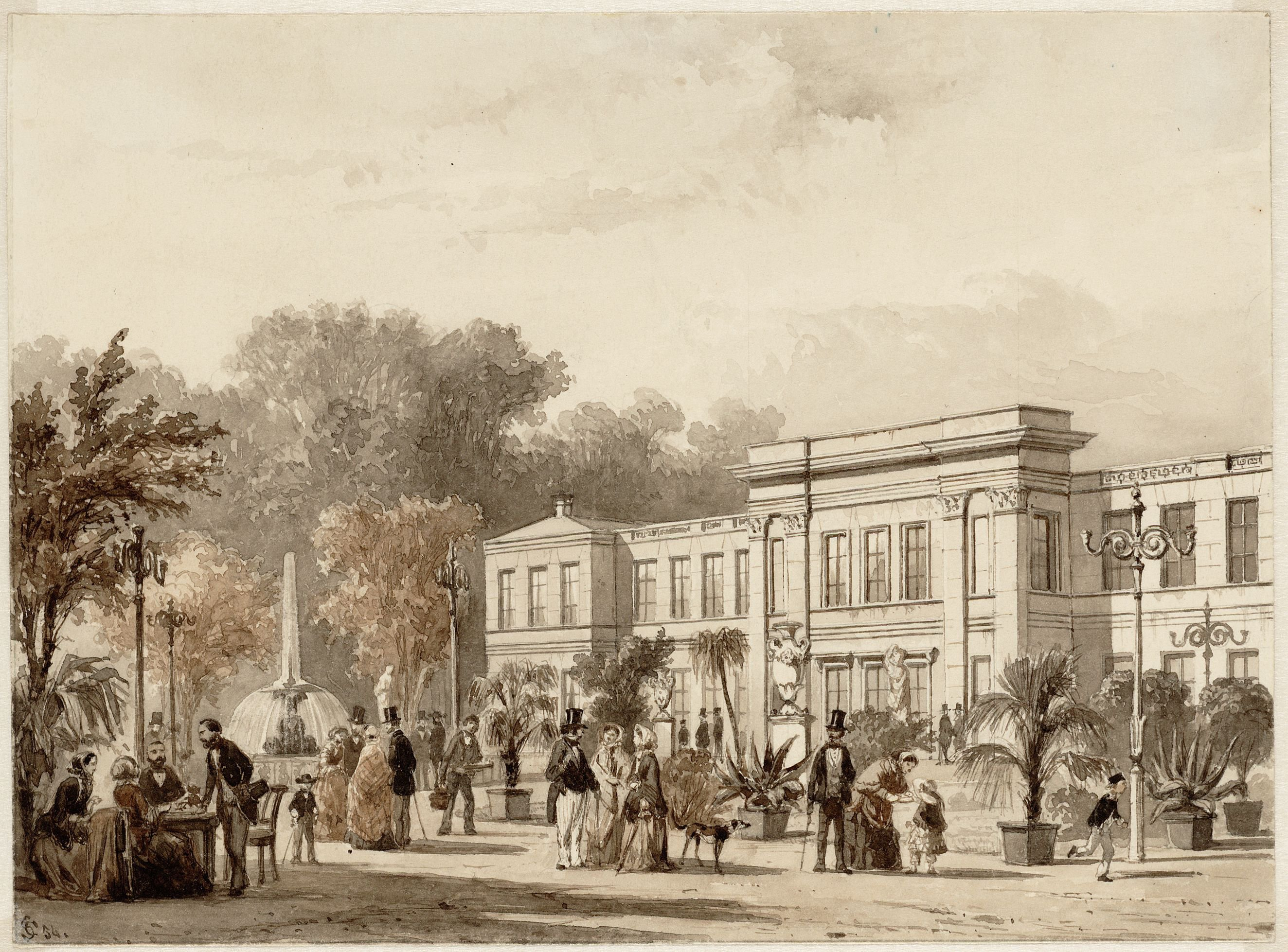
Parklokaal, also called Parkzaal

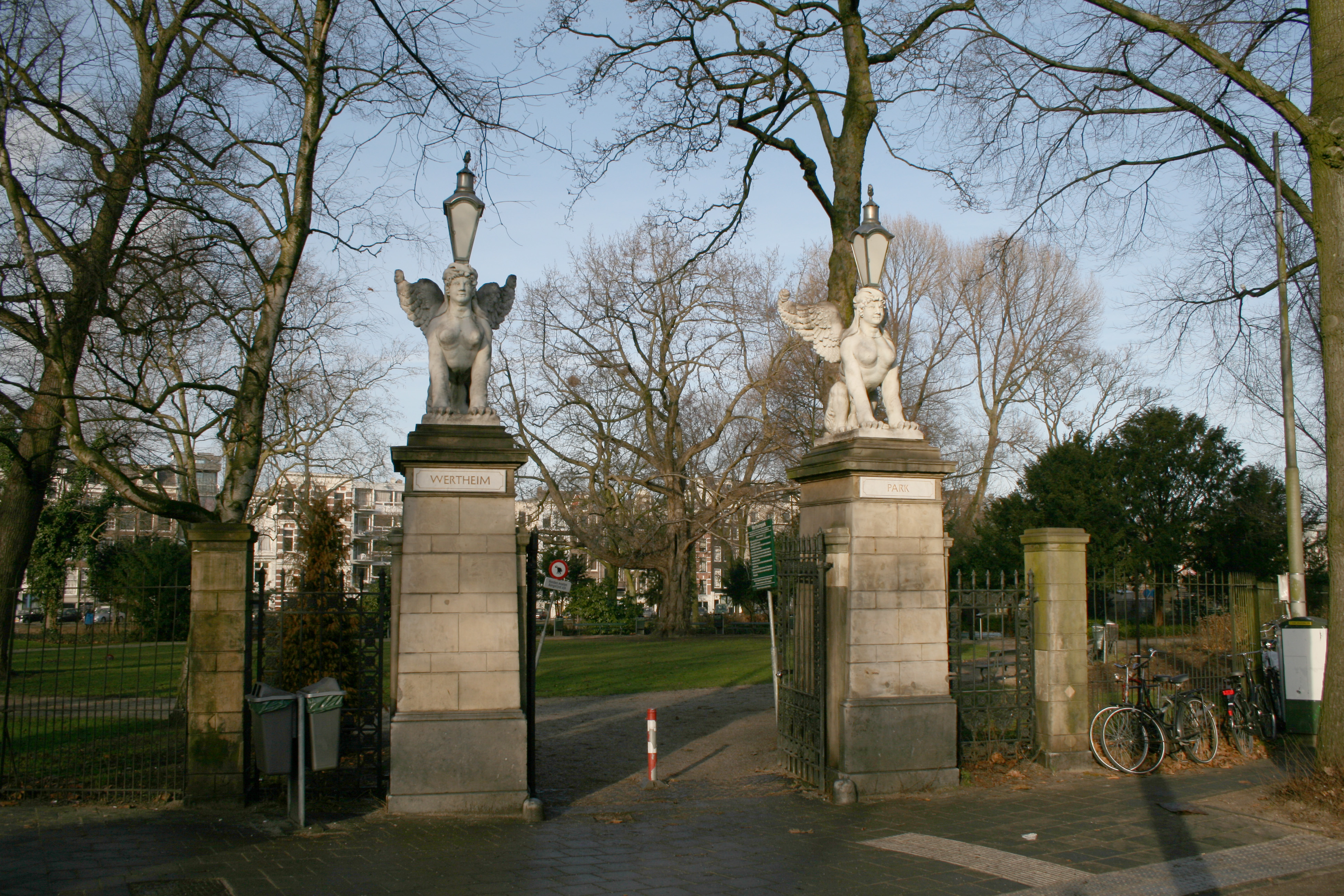
Gate of the former Parklokaal, now Wertheimpark

On 17 August 1869 a new international organisation for the development of trade met in the Parkzaal (now Wertheim park) in Amsterdam. It discussed the opening of the Suez Canal and an upcoming trade congress in Cairo. Mr. J. Boissevain stated that it was now possible and necessary to establish a steam shipping line to Java. The Netherlands had to take the initiative, and had to do so quickly. Government support was essential because the government was the biggest trader on Java. Mr. Boele noted that Dutch shipping to the Indies and across the Atlantic was so backward that it could not establish the steam shipping line without the help of the government and foreign aid. It was not about subsidies, but about cooperation, because the state was a monopolist on Java. He also noted that English capital and ships to establish a steam shipping line had already been offered to him via the Dutch consul in Liverpool. Engineer A. Huet urged more speed on the works of the harbors for Amsterdam and Rotterdam. Mr. Boelen (a different speaker than Boele) made some remarks that the new steam ships should be made suitable to carry passengers, freight and coal, without going to deep.

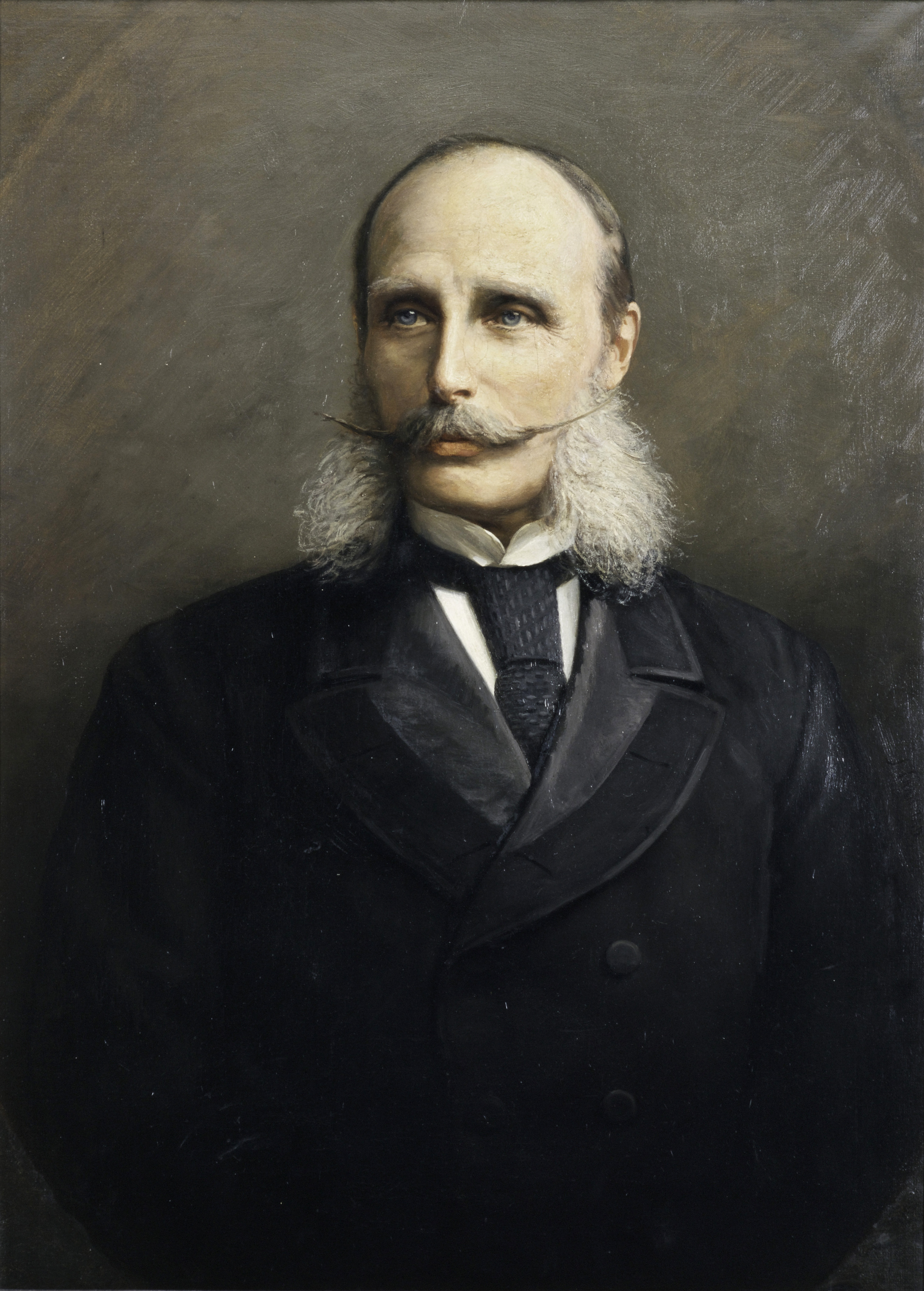
Prins Hendrik of the Netherlands

The chairman of the congress then brought three motions to decide on: The first was that the Dutch trading community should be present in Cairo. The third was that the Suez Canal should be neutral. The second motion was about the statements by Boissevain and Boele. The congress stated that it thought the immediate establishment of a steam shipping line to be the best way to profit from the new canal, and recommended the company to the trading community and the government.

Now the government acted quickly. By 26 August 1869 a commission had been formed on the instigation and under the protection of Prince Hendrik, nicknamed "The Seafarer". It consisted of G.J. Boelen, J.G. Bunge and J. Boissevain and was to negotiate the foundation of a regular steam shipping line from the Netherlands via Suez to the Dutch East Indies. On 31 August the commission was working 'under the leadership of Prince Henry' at Soestdijk Palace his summer residence. On 1 September the commission was summoned and received by the king. He was informed of the plans and views of the commission and declared that the foundation of the shipping line was one of his most serious wishes.

The questions and challenges that had to be addressed out by the commission were many. The kind of ships that were required, the number of ships required, a calculation of when the company would be profitable, and finally how much capital was required. The required amount of capital was staggering and required some kind of government assistance, subsidy or guarantee to raise it. This was also why Prince Henry was involved. The Amsterdam Chamber of Commerce was also involved in the discussion, and addressed the finance minister to support and cooperate in the plan for a direct shipping line between the Netherlands and Java. In mid September the commission again met at Soestdijk.

=== The contract between the state and the company ===
In February 1870 a contract was signed between the department for the Colonies and the commission. It was a detailed agreement. The commission would get the time to found a public company before 15 May 1870. It had to commission four steamships of a certain specification for a line to the Dutch East Indies. The first of these had to leave for the Indies within one year of founding the company. On each return trip the government would guarantee a substantial amount of cargo for a minimum price. In return the state got a preferred position on the less costly route towards the Dutch East Indies. There were penalties for trips that took longer than 50 days. The guaranteed price and preferred position would last till 1 January 1875, at which date a new contract would start.

The complexity of the guarantee was connected with the trade system on Java. The Netherlands Trading Society still had a quasi monopoly on the production of coffee, tea, sugar and indigo, and Dutch shipping lines could subscribe to transporting these for the lowest price. If this system was maintained, steamships would not get any cargo. Steamships had higher costs, but for the owner of the cargo a higher tariff was redeemed by lower capital cost, lower insurance cost and better quality. Therefore, the Netherlands Trading Society had to agree beforehand on paying for this advantage, instead of using (or being forced to use by law) her monopoly to drive down prices on steamships to the level of those for sailing ships.

The guarantee was devised such that on each return trip to the Netherlands Trading Society would guarantee a cargo of 600 lasts (c. 1,200 tons), but in total not more than 4,800 lasts in the first year. The guaranteed price would be 22,50 guilders higher than the average price agreed by the NTS for sailing ships in the previous 12 months. The minimum for this average would be 75 guilders per last, so the guaranteed price was 97.50 guilders. In case that the company would use smaller ships, this minimum would be 20 guilders above the average. For tin the tariff would be only one fourth of the above.

=== Prospectus and foundation of the public company ===
On 14 March 1870 the prospectus of the company was published. The board of directors would consist of the executive members: G.J. Boelen, J. Boissevain and C.J. Viehoff; and the non-executive members J.G. Bunge, A.C. Wertheim, C.A. Crommelin, A.A. Bienfait all from Amsterdam, and M.M. de Monchy (Rotterdam), P.C. Loopuyt (Rotterdam) and J.E. Cornelissen (Utrecht). There was also a supervisory board of commissioners, not directors, consisting of Cornelis Jacob Arnold den Tex mayor of Amsterdam, E. Fuld, E. Mohr, A.R.J. Cramerus and C.F. Quien all from Amsterdam, under the honorary presidency of Prince Henry. The capital of the company would be 6,000,000 guilders, of which 3,500,000 would be placed, divided in shares of 1,000 guilders each and sub-shares of 500 guilders each. The money would be used to buy ships and invest in warehouses, workshops and jetties. The prospectus announced that the company would buy somewhat larger ships than required. The prospectus held a rather detailed calculation of the profitability of the investment, promising a 16% dividend.

The public could subscribe to shares on 24, 25 and 26 March 1870. The subscription failed when it got stuck on 2,487,000 guilders, one million short. A new subscription was opened for 2 and 4 April. This second attempt succeeded in placing the remaining shares.

On 13 May 1870 the contract for the foundation of the public company was signed. It led to a very long publication of the names and number of shares of all shareholders in the company.

=== Requirements for the first ships ===
In late September 1869 some thoughts about the required ships had been published. It started with a description of recent developments in the construction of steamships and steam propulsion. Ships had become longer, carried more cargo, had smaller engines, lower coal consumption and combined all this with sufficient speed. As a consequence the sailing ship with auxiliary power was losing ground, and especially the British shipping lines were opting for full steam power on their oceanic lines in the western hemisphere. It concluded that for the shipping line to Java the most suitable ship was a screw steamship of 2,500 tons capacity with 400 or 450 hp. These would be able to make the journey in 36–40 days including days lost in bunkering coal in Egypt. A big part of the cargo space would be lost in loading coal for half the trip. Much space would be taken by passengers and soldiers, but even so a significant amount of space would be left for cargo. The freight tariff was expected to be so high that coffee, tobacco, sugar would still be transported by sailing ships. The SMN expected that the advantage of quicker transport was so big that coffee would be transported by steamship.

The contract between the state and the company required the company to commission four ships of a certain minimum size. An annex contained a description of these ships based on negotiations with shipbuilder John Elder. The ships were described as being 2,400 tons Builders Measure, or 2,000 Register tons. They would have to be about 320 feet long between perpendiculars. Beam was to be about 39 feet, and hold till the spar deck 29 feet. The preferred type would be spar deck or flush deck, and the ships would answer to the requirements of several lloyd's. Cargo space should be about 120,000 cubic feet and about 640 tons of coal would have to be loaded. With 2,300 tons of cargo, 700 tons of coal, and about 100 tons of provisions, draught should be 22.5 feet.

Accommodation was specified as 50 passengers first class, 50-200 passengers 2nd and 3rd class and 70 crew. First class accommodation would be between the stern and the machine room. Each cabin would have no more than two beds, not placed above each other, and leaving room for wash stands, luggage etc. Longitudinal and transverse corridors, portholes and other measures should ensure lighting and ventilation of the cabins. The saloon of the first class should span the whole width of the ship, and be divided in a general saloon and a ladies room, both closed off from the cabins by doors. On the spar deck there would be a small smokers and ladies room etc. etc. A light schooner rigging would be carried as a safety precaution.

The engines would be 325 hp Elders compound engines. These would have to be able to develop 1,300 effective hp. Two cylindrical boilers with 6 furnaces each would have to be able to handle 60 pound steam pressure. The space taken by the engine was also limited by the contract. All in all the engines and boilers should give the ship a speed of 10 knots with a coal consumption of 23-25 tons. The trial run would have to reach 11 knots. The specification was signed on account of John Elder by Ch.J. Viehoff. The company could deviate somewhat from this contract, especially on account of the depth of the Suez Canal. The prospectus of 14 March 1870 announced somewhat larger ships than required. The ships would be of 2,000 tons cargo space and 400 nominal horse power, 1,600 ihp in order to ensure a more regular service.

== Operational history ==
=== The 1870s ===
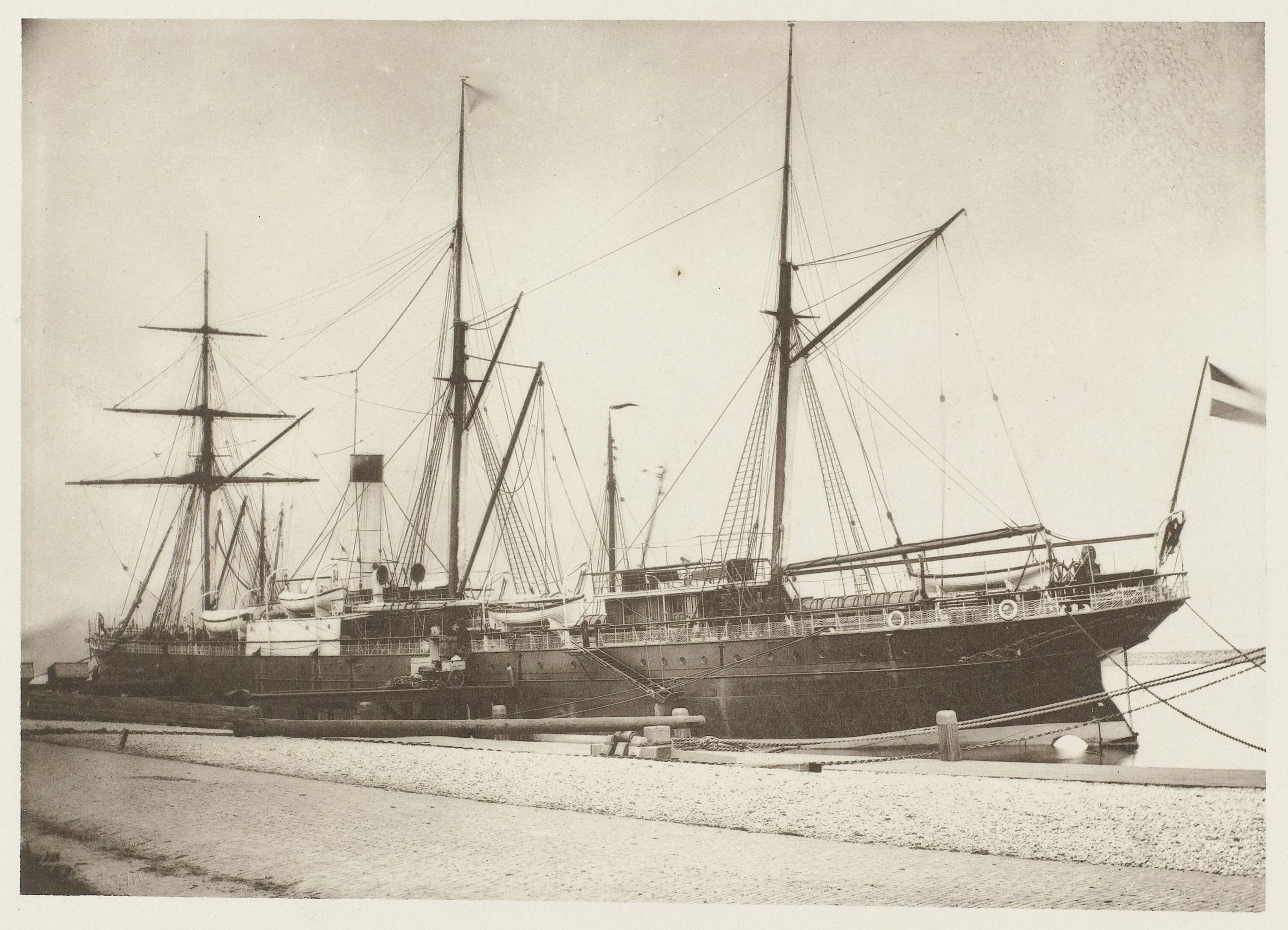
Willem III, SMN's first ship, in Nieuwediep in 1871

The Stoomvaart Maatschappij Nederland was based in Amsterdam, but initially its ships could not reach that city. From 1870 to 1879 the company's ships therefore sailed from Den Helder (Nieuwediep) to Java. The company also had its own warehouses in Nieuwediep for loading and unloading to smaller ships, that could reach Amsterdam via the Noordhollandsch Kanaal. Passengers, mail and some freight that required fast service could go by train to and from Naples, Marseille or Genoa in order to keep the travelling time as short as possible, but this was not done on the first trips.

As regards freight, the company could initially profit from a government guarantee of about half the homeward freight during the first four years. This freight primarily consisted of goods produced by the government-run plantations and industries in the East Indies. E.g. tin from Bangka, tobacco, tea and copra. From Europe SMN would ship manufactured goods, factory equipment and railroad materials.

==== 1871 ====
The first ship of the SMN, Willem III arrived in Nieuwdiep on 8 May 1871. She left for the East Indies on 17 May, but was burnt and beached near Wight two days later. She was insured for 800,000 guilders, and so SMN suffered a heavy loss, but could order a new ship to replace her. This would become Koning der Nederlanden. SMN's second ship was Prins van Oranje. She arrived in Batavia on 9 September 1871. She started her return voyage on 15 October, but got so much trouble with her propellers, that her return was delayed to 30 December 1871. The delay and the repeated repairs led to a significant loss. The third ship of the company was Prins Hendrik. She arrived in Nieuwdiep on 2 November 1871 under Captain Hendriks, and was noted to be much longer than the previous two ships. She left Nieuwediep on 19 November 1871, and arrived in Batavia on 29 December 1871.

==== 1872 ====
After the disastrous first year of the company an extraordinary meeting of shareholders was convened on 25 March 1872. The apparent reasons were the disaster of Willem III and the screw problems of Prins van Oranje and Prins Hendrik causing so much trouble for the SMN that she was out of money. This meeting took place in the Amstelhotel. The directors wanted to change the articles of association of the company, and to issue a convertible loan of 3,500,000 guilders. A critic noted that the board gave a rather limited account of why it needed more money to strengthen the capital, and why it wanted to buy two more ships. He wanted more details about how the stock of 3,500,000 had been spent and about the profitability of the first trips. He also wanted details about the problems with the ships built in Scotland.

Five shareholders from Rotterdam (Mees, Plate, Pincoffs, Pols and Ruys) required a change in the articles so that the directors would no longer appoint captains and shipping agencies. Their problem was that director G.J. Boelen was also the exclusive shipping agent for the company, and they wanted to see the contract with him. The board announced that G.J. Boelen had resigned, and had the contract read to the meeting, instead of distributing it in print. It showed that the exclusive contract had been made for ten years, with high penalties in case the board would end it. Such a contract was clearly not in the interest of the SMN and the shareholders. After a lot of commotion Mr. Plate noted that: while he was busy promoting the establishment of the SMN among investors in Rotterdam, he could not imagine that one of the directors would appoint himself as its exclusive shipping agent. Shortly after the meeting Mr Plate was decorated with the Order of the Netherlands Lion. F.D. Franssen van de Putte then carried a motion to appoint a commission to investigate how the board should be formed. He was appointed chairman, and other members were C. Hartsen, N.G. Pierson, L. Pincoffs and P.H. Holzman. On 31 May 1872 the regular shareholders meeting took place. The loss for 1871 was 141,000 guilders, about 85,000 was caused by the burning of Willem III, 10,000 by the delayed first trip of Prins van Oranje. The report by the Franssen van de Putte commission was treated, and led to more authority for the executive directors.

During 1872 the results improved to an operational result of 178,767 guilders, but depreciation turned this into a loss of 48,507 guilders. The SMN did prove the correctness of establishing a steam shipping line. Freight for tobacco paid by merchants was 90-110 guilders a last for steamships, as opposed 55-70 guilders for sailing ships. The board mentioned that the backward harbor of Batavia cost her 12-16 guilders a last for transloading, and compared it to the much cheaper Singapore. For outbound freight SMN started to include a stop at Southampton, so British manufactured goods could be loaded. The board also mentioned that Prins van Oranje had been allowed to use the navy dry dock at Onrust Island in order to repair her screw, and that she wanted to invest 25,000 guilders in the establishment of the Nederlandsch Indische Droogdok Maatschappij, which would establish dry docks for merchant ships.

As regards operations, the fourth ship was Conrad. She arrived at Nieuwediep on 19 February 1872 under command of captain Oort. In November 1872 the fifth ship Koning der Nederlanden arrived in Nieuwediep. With this replacement for Willem III the SMN finally had four ships in operation.

==== 1873 onwards ====
In 1873 Prins Hendrik I was wrecked on the Brothers Islands in the Red Sea on 27 September. Almost immediately a replacement, Prins Hendrik was ordered in Glasgow. SMN also ordered Prinses Amalia in 1873, and the orders for Voorwaarts were probably also placed in 1873. As such SMN executed the above plans to increase her fleet to six ships. During 1873 9 outbound and 8 homeward bound trips were made with the first four ships, as well as three outbound trips with chartered ships. The net profit over 1873 was 193,879 guilders after 153,600 guilders had been booked on depreciation. The net profit was used to cover the losses of the first years.

In 1874 the three new steamships were commissioned, and one ships was chartered. Net profit was 230,000 guilders, leading to a dividend (the first) of 5%. In 1875 the SMN did very well, with a growth in cargo and passengers of about 75%, and ships sailing faster and more reliable. It led to an operational profit of 820,000 guilders, after depreciation of 380,000, divided was again 5%. The only cargo that decreased was the amount of produce transported for the Netherlands Trading Society. Strictly commercial parties offered to pay a higher tariff to SMN for shipping their products, and so the trading society was forced to ship produce on cheaper ships.

In 1876 the SMN started a cooperation with her competitor the Stoomvaart Maatschappij Java (SMJ). On 31 May 1876 the shareholders of SMJ approved the lease of all the ships of SMJ to SMN. That same day the SMN held her regular shareholders meeting, and proposed the cooperation with the SMJ. The SMN shareholders were far less enthusiastic but in the end they also agreed. Most of the ships of the SMJ would be used for cargo, except for Celebes.

=== 1880s onwards ===
The new Noordzeekanaal (North Sea Canal) opened in November 1876 and connected Amsterdam directly to the North Sea. It created an easier route to SMN's home base, but it took some more time to make it deep enough for big fully loaded sea ships. The first of these arrived in Amsterdam in October 1878. In order to be able to repair her ships, SMN enabled the foundation of the Amsterdamsche Droogdok Maatschappij by taking almost three-quarters of the shares.

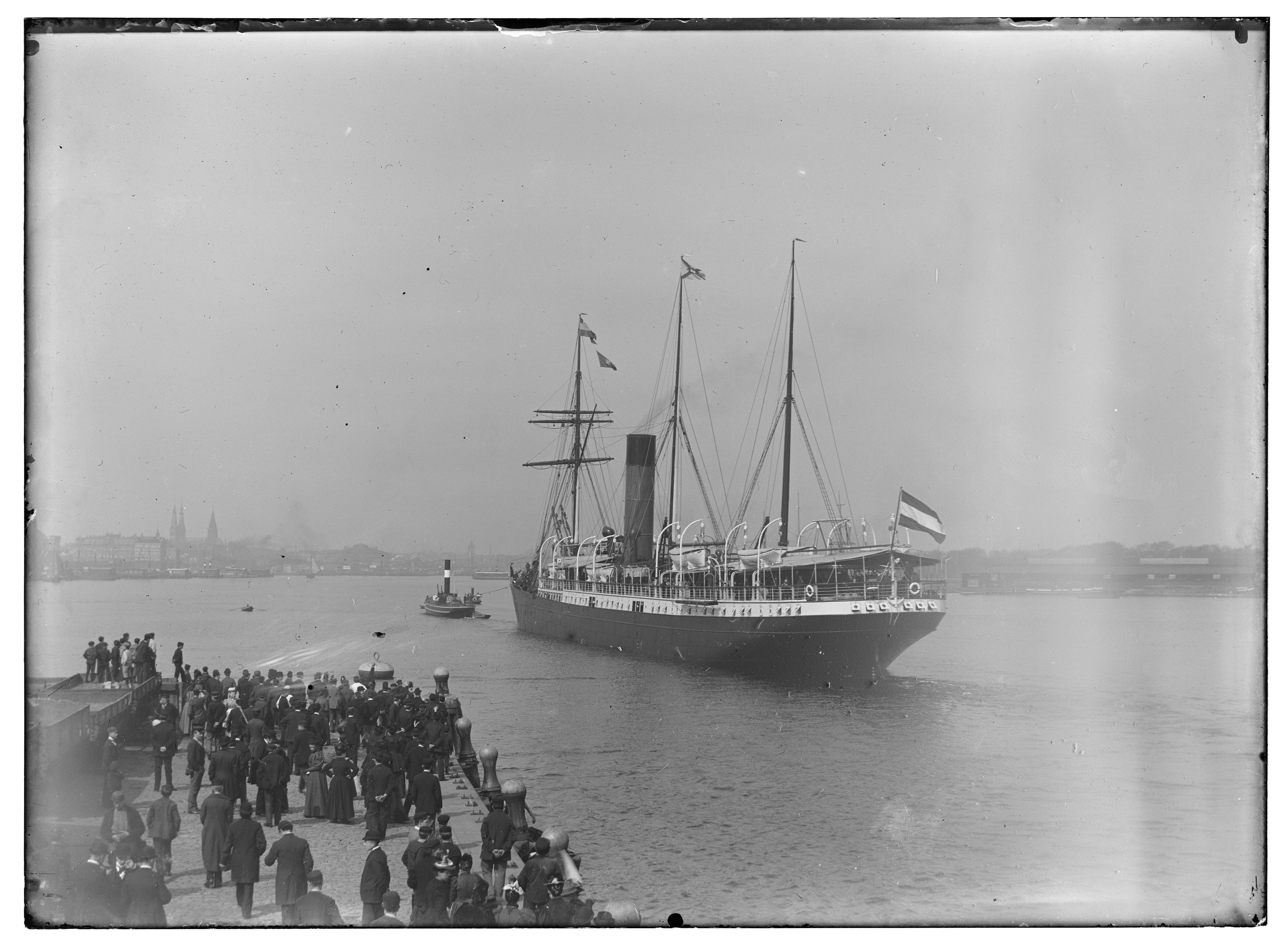
Prinses Sophie, completed in 1890

The company then got its own facilities in Amsterdam. The Oostelijke Handelskade (Eastern Trade dock, 1883–1910) and the Java and Sumatra docks became its center in The Netherlands. In Europe ships called regularly at Amsterdam, Southampton and Genoa. In the Dutch East Indies ships plied mainly to the ports on the northern coast of the island of Java, e.g. Jakarta (then known as Batavia), Surabaya and Tanjung Priok. Coal was regularly taken at Valletta, Port Said, Aden, Colombo and Sabang.

In the early decades of the 20th century the company opened new routes operating across the Pacific Ocean between Java and the American West Coast, and, via the Panama Canal, between Java and New York City.

=== First World War and after ===
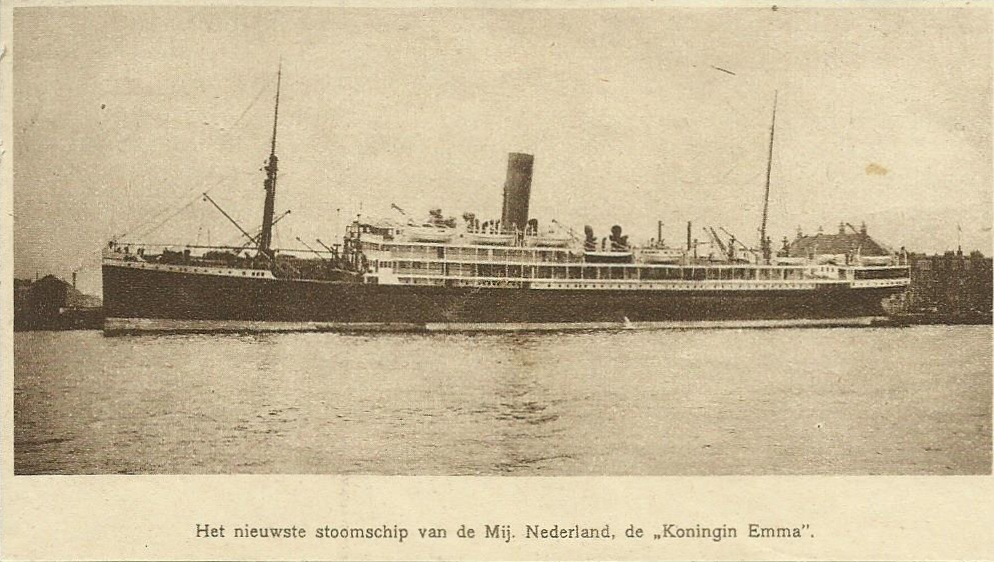
Koningin Emma, which was sunk by a German mine in 1915

The Netherlands were neutral in the First World War, but SMN lost two ships to mines in the North Sea. The newly built Nieuwland, which had been completed in August 1914, was sunk by a mine at the mouth of the Humber that October. In September 1915 the 9,000 GRT passenger liner Koningin Emma struck a mine that UC-7 had laid near the mouth of the Thames Estuary. There were no fatalities in either sinking.

On 1 February 1917, Germany resumed unrestricted submarine warfare. In April 1917 the USA responded by declaring war against the Central Powers. By June 1917, US authorities were detaining Dutch merchant ships in US ports. On 21 March 1918 the United States Customs Service seized 88 Dutch ships under angary, including at least eight SMN ships: Bali, Batjan, Borneo, Celebes, Koningin der Nederlanden, Radja, Roepat, and Rondo. The United Kingdom also seized Dutch ships, including SMN's Boeroe, Kambangan, Lombok, Prinses Juliana, and Sumatra.

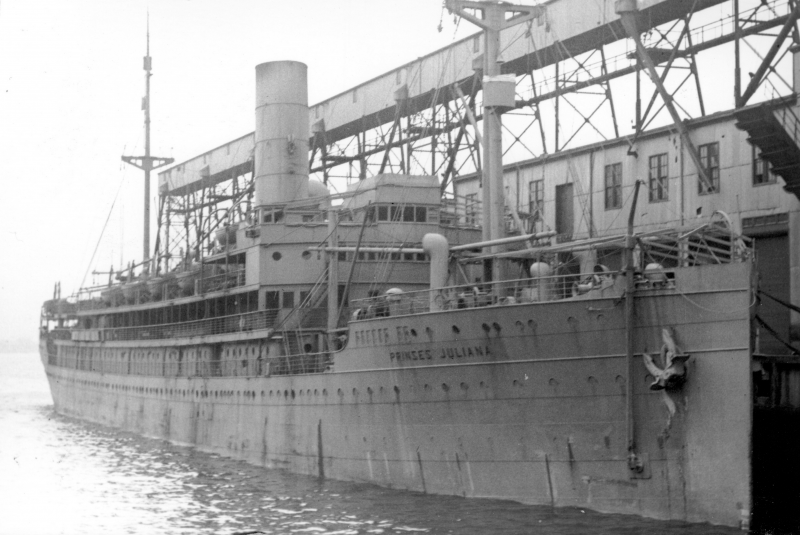
Prinses Juliana as a UK troopship in Boston in 1919

The passenger ships Koningin der Nederlanden and Prinses Juliana were converted into troopships. The cargo ships were vested in either the United States Shipping Board or the UK Shipping Controller. Some of the ships seized by the USA were commissioned into the United States Navy. All of the SMN ships under Allied control survived the war, and were returned to SMN in 1919.

In the 1920s and 30s SMN renewed its fleet. It introduced new cargo ships, some with passenger accommodation, and new ocean liners, including Johan de Witt in 1920, Pieter Corneliszoon Hooft in 1925, Christiaan Huygens in 1928, Johan van Oldenbarnevelt in 1929, Marnix van Sint Aldegonde in 1930, and Oranje in 1938.

=== Second World War ===
During the Second World War many of the company's ships took part in the Allied war effort. At least 17 were lost to enemy action, with the loss of nearly 600 lives.

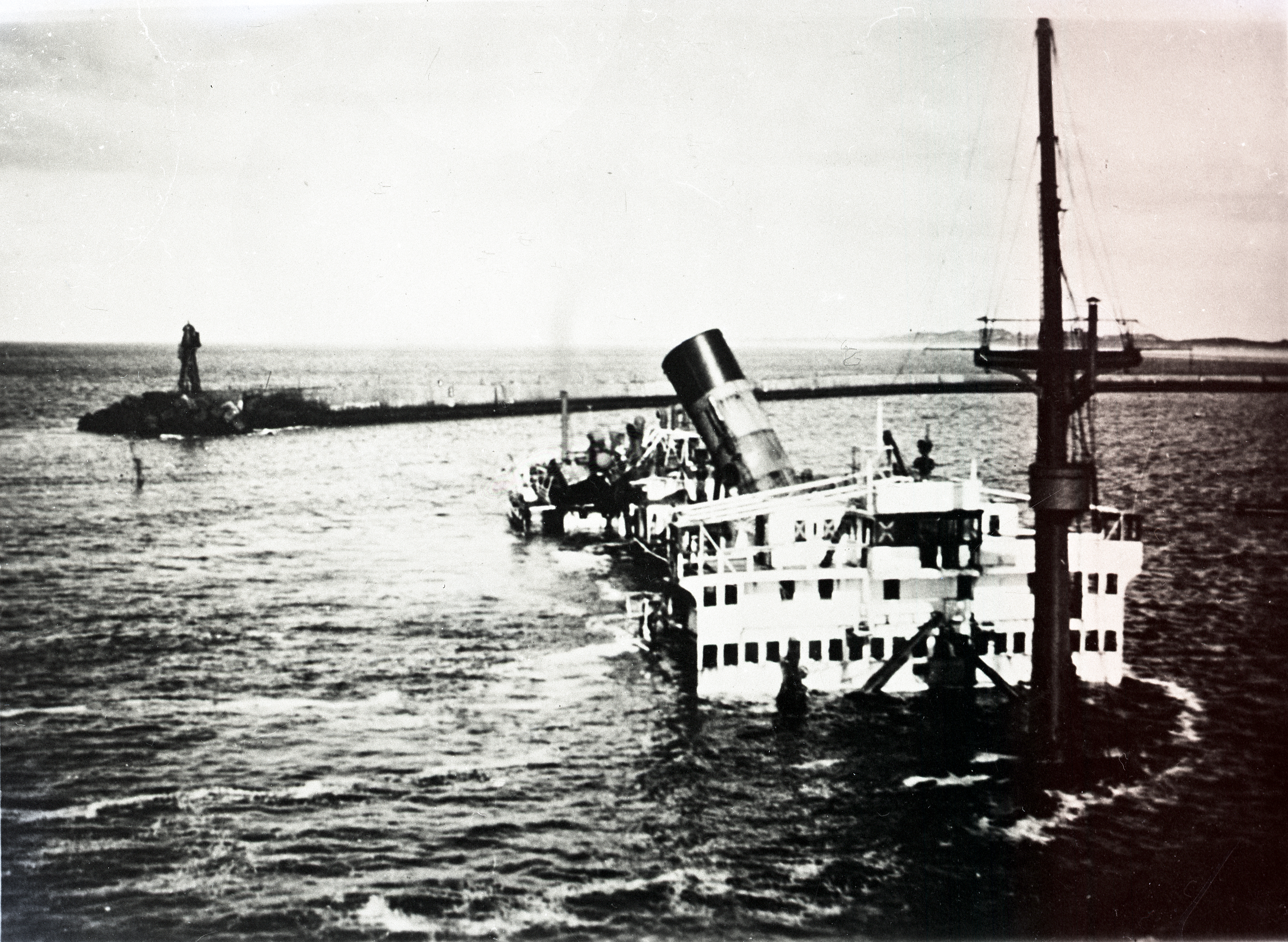
Jan Pieterszoon Coen scuttled as a blockship in IJmuiden harbour mouth

SMN's first war-related loss was on 7 December 1939, when the Netherlands were still neutral. U-47 torpedoed Tajandoen in the English Channel, sinking her and killing six of her crew. The next loss was on 14 May 1940, during the German invasion of the Netherlands, when the British Royal Navy scuttled the 11,000 GRT liner Jan Pieterszoon Coen in the harbour mouth at IJmuiden as a blockship.

The greatest loss of life from an SMN ship was on 7 March 1942, when aircraft from the Japanese aircraft carrier Hiryū sank Poelau Bras in the Indian Ocean. She was carrying 100 passengers from the Bataafse Petroleum Maatschappij, Royal Dutch Shell, and the British Royal Navy, as well as her own crew. 144 people were killed.

In 1943 two SMN ships were sunk by torpedo when they were carrying ammunition, and in each case only one crew member survived. On 13 March U-107 sank Sembilangan in the North Atlantic, killing 86 crew. The only survivor was the Fourth Engineer, who was blown overboard when the ship exploded. He found a liferaft from another ship that had been sunk in the same attack, and was rescued by the corvette HMS Spiraea. On 17 April the Italian submarine Leonardo da Vinci sank Sembilan in the Indian Ocean. The only survivor was an Indian lascar, whom Leonardo da Vinci rescued.

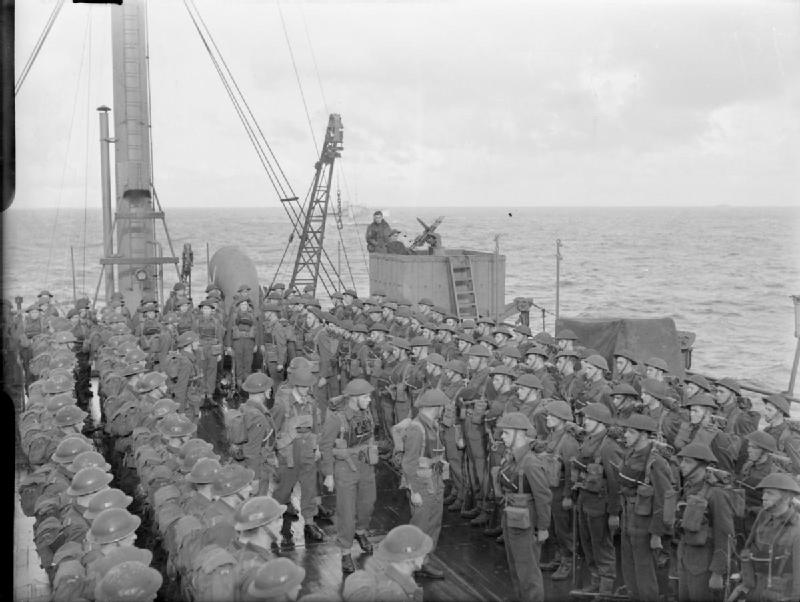
Allied troop inspection aboard Marnix van Sint Aldegonde

SMN lost two troopships with minimal loss of life. On 7 November 1943, the 19,000 GRT Marnix van Sint Aldegonde was carrying 3,000 troops when a German aircraft torpedoed her in the Mediterranean. No-one was killed, she stayed afloat, and all 3,235 people aboard were rescued. On 26 August 1945 the 16,000 GRT Christiaan Huygens struck an Allied mine in the North Sea off the Dutch coast. One person was killed. The ship grounded, and by 5 September she had broken her back and was a total loss.

On 23 February 1943 Madoera survived being torpedoed by U-653 in the Atlantic, but lost 60 members of her crew, most of them Indian lascars, in two lifeboats. Other ships lost to enemy action were Balingkar, Bintang, Enggano, Kentar, Mangkalihat, Moena, Poelau Roebiah, Poelau Tello, Salabangka, Saleier, Simaloer, Soemba, and Tanimbar.

=== After the Second World War ===
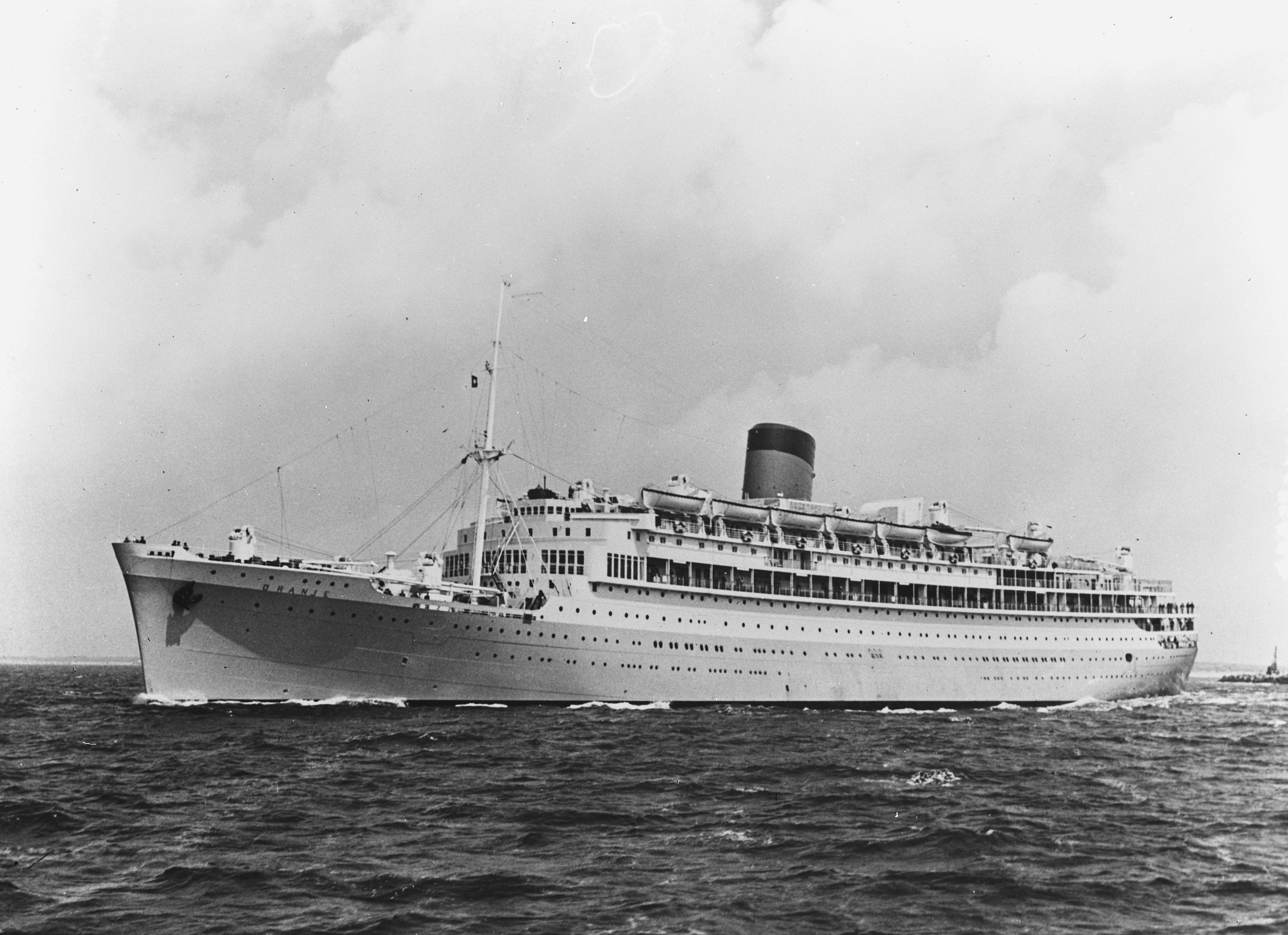
Oranje at sea

Indonesia won its independence in 1949, the Dutch colonial empire declined, and commercial aviation took an increasing share of passenger travel. Dutch trade with the former colonies declined. Some trade with Indonesia remained possible until 1960; thereafter Dutch ships were no longer allowed to ply in Indonesian waters. Needing alternative business, the company intensified development of its other routes – linking the Netherlands, South Africa, North and South America, India and the Far East – and also built up its chartering business.

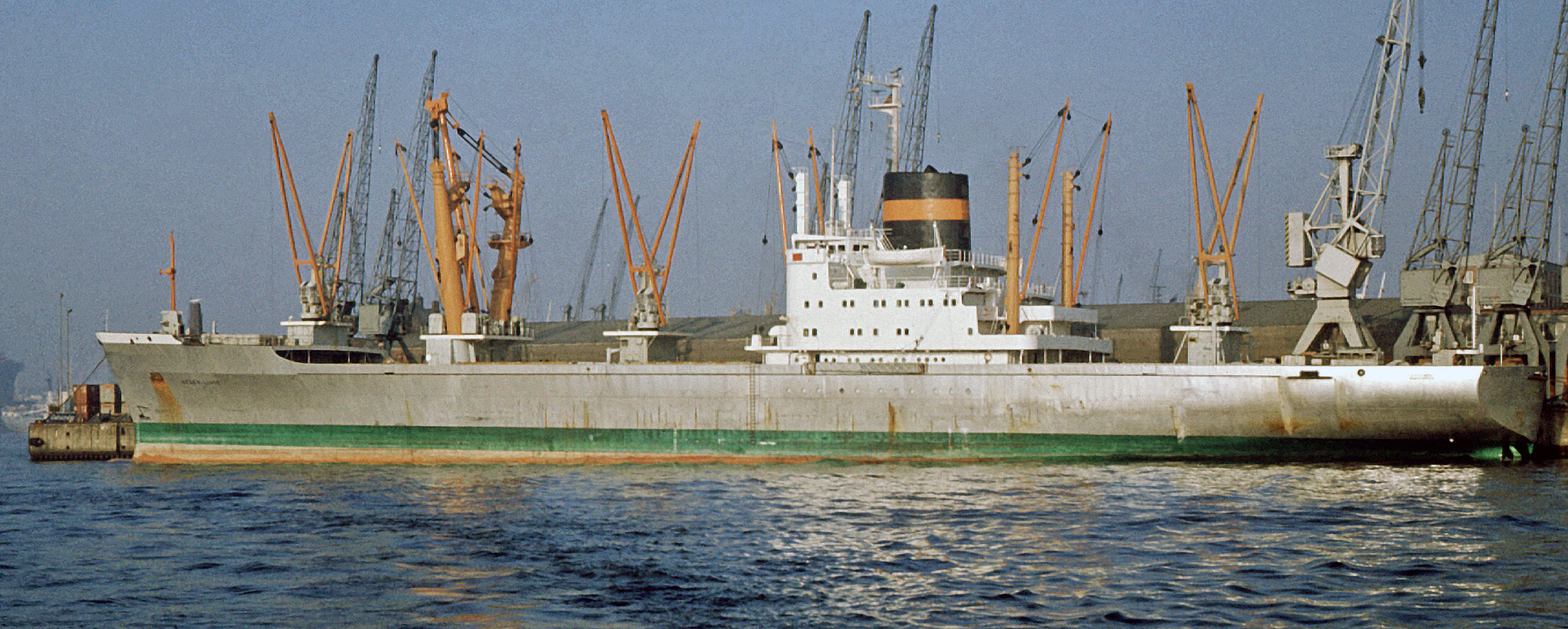
Neder Linge, one of the last conventional cargo ships, built in 1967

As well as its freight and passenger services, SMN also took part in other transport ventures – for example, Martin Air Charter (now Martinair), the specialized liquefied natural gas tanker Antilla Cape, Container Terminal Amsterdam (CTA) and van Swieten Trucking. In the 1960s SMN acquired Hollandsche Stoomboot Maatschappij with regular services to England and West Africa.

Starting in the late 1950s, the advent of mass air travel spelled the end of the ocean liners. The company's passenger routes were closed and the ships sold, leaving the company to concentrate on freight, which from the 1970s onwards increasingly meant container ships.

=== Collaborations and mergers ===
Hailing from Amsterdam, SMN always enjoyed friendly competition and rivalry with Rotterdam shipping company Rotterdamsche Lloyd (KRL), especially on the East Indies route. In 1963 SMN and KRL jointly founded Nedlloyd Lines (NLL). From 1968 the SMN also closely cooperated with KJCPL–RIL (Royal InterOcean Lines) of Amsterdam and Hong Kong.

This cooperation amongst friendly Dutch shipowners eventually resulted in a full merger. On January 20, 1970, the SMN joined with three other companies to form the Nederlandsche Scheepvaart Unie (NSU) and ceased to exist as a separate entity, having just failed to reach its 100th anniversary. The NSU partners were:

- Stoomvaart Maatschappij Nederland (SMN)
- Koninklijke Rotterdamsche Lloyd (KRL)
- Koninklijke Java-China-Paketvaart-Lijnen (KJCPL)
- Vereenigde Nederlandsche Scheepvaartmaatschappij (VNS)

Later on NSU became Nedlloyd, and in 1977 the name changed to Koninklijke Nedlloyd ("Royal Nedlloyd"). In 1981 the Koninklijke Nederlandsche Stoomboot-Maatschappij (KNSM) completed the group.

In 1996, Koninklijke Nedlloyd merged its container shipping interests with the British company P&O to become, as P&O Nedlloyd, a major player in the worldwide container trade. In 2005 A.P. Moller-Maersk Group (Maersk) from Denmark acquired P&O Nedlloyd and the newly formed Maersk Line subsequently became the world's largest container shipping line.

== Offices ==
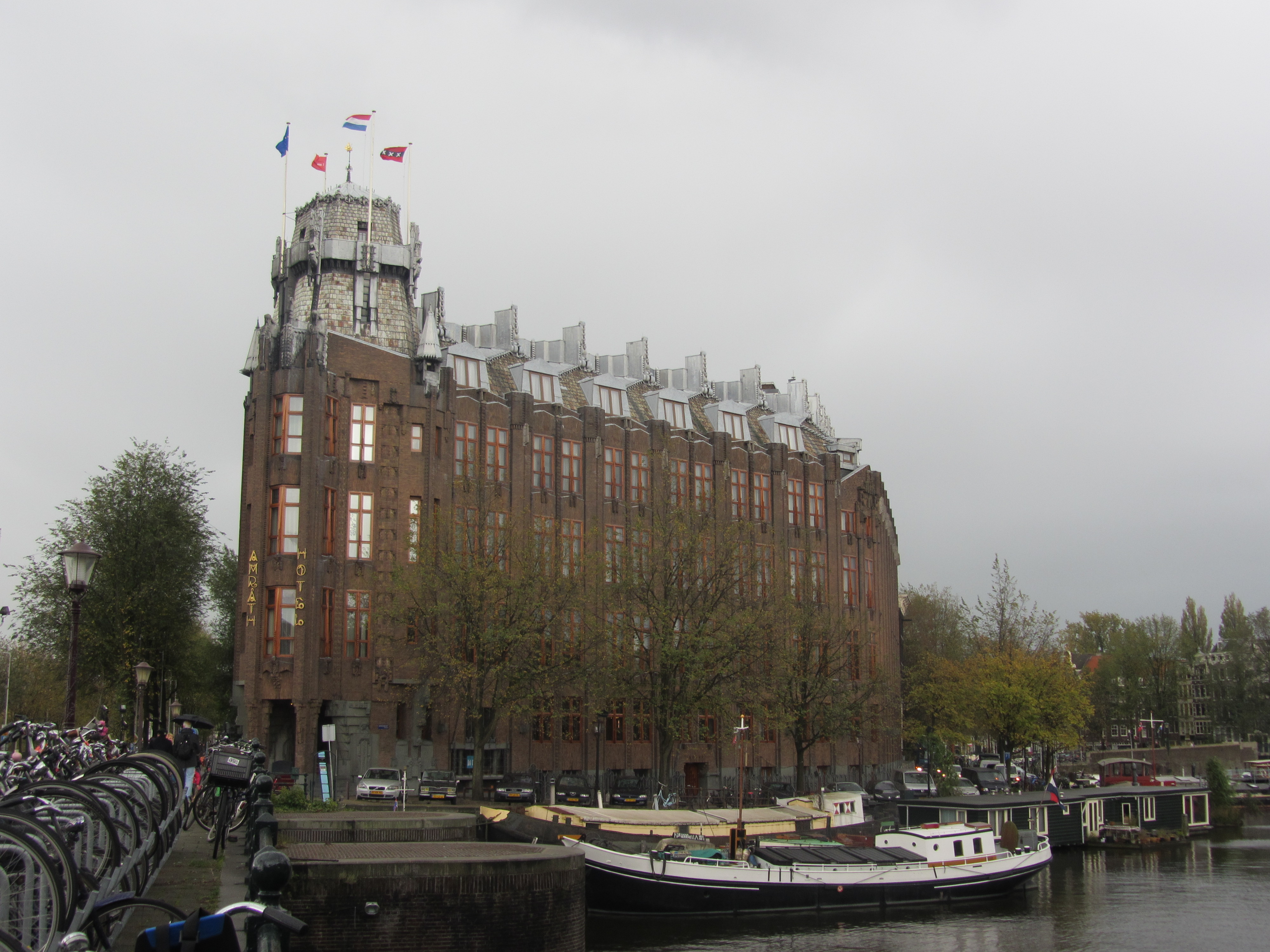
Scheepvaarthuis

SMN was first headquartered at the IJgracht, eastern part of the Prins Hendrikkade. Later, it moved to the Scheepvaarthuis (Shipping House) together with other shipping companies. Employees arriving by bicycle came through the side entrance and used the famous Paternoster elevators to reach their floors. A monumental staircase led directly to the directors' floor.

The company also maintained offices in Jakarta.

== Heritage ==
The history and heritage of the Stoomboot Maatschappij 'Nederland' and other Dutch shipping companies is preserved at the Amsterdam and Rotterdam maritime museums.

== Fleet development ==
=== The four required ships ===
- Willem III (lost May 1871)
- Prins van Oranje
- Prins Hendrik (lost 27 September 1873)
- Conrad
- Koning der Nederlanden (3,000 tons, sunk on 5 October 1881. Three of her lifeboats with a total of 90 passengers and crew were never found.)

=== Alphabetical list of ships ===
The Netherland Line's first ship, Willem III, was launched in 1871. Its last under that flag were the Neder "L-class" ships Neder Linge and Neder Lek, launched in 1967–68. The following is a selected list of the ships operated by the company throughout its 100-year history. Tonnages are approximate.

- Ambon
- Amsteldiep
- Amstelhof
- Angolakaust
- Bali
- Balong
- Banda
- Banggai
- Banka
- Batang
- Batjan
- Batoe
- Batu
- Bawean
- Bengkalis
- Billiton
- Bintang
- Boeroe
- Boeton
- Boissevain
- Borneo
- Burgemeester den Tex
- Calcutta
- Camerounkust
- Celebes
- Ceram
- Christiaan Huygens (liner, 16,000 tons, launched 1927, destroyed by mine 1945)
- Colombia
- Conrad
- Cuanza
- Eemstroom
- Elmina
- Enggano
- Flores
- Gabonkust
- Grotius
- Guineekust
- Insulinde
- Jan Pieterszoon Coen
- Java
- Johan de Witt
- Johan van Oldenbarnevelt (liner, 19,000 tons, launched 1929, sold and renamed Lakonia 1963, destroyed by fire 1963)
- Kambangan
- Kangean
- Kap Hoorn
- Karachi
- Karakorum
- Karimata
- Karimoen
- Karimun
- Koning der Nederlanden (3,000 tons, sunk 5 October 1881. Three of her lifeboats with a total of 90 passengers and crew were never found.)
- Koning Willem I
- Koning Willem II
- Koning Willem III
- Koningin der Nederlanden
- Koningin Emma
- Koningin Regentes
- Koningin Wilhelmina
- Krakatau
- Lawak
- Lekkerkerk
- Liberiakust
- Linderkerk
- Lombok
- Madoera
- Madura
- Manoeran
- Mapia
- Marnix van Sint Aldegonde (liner, 19,000 tons, launched 1930, sunk by torpedo 1945)
- Moena
- Nanusa
- Neder Ebro
- Neder Eems
- Neder Elbe
- Neder Lek (cargo ship, 10,000 tons, launched 1968)
- Neder Linge (cargo ship, 10,000 tons, launched 1967)
- Neder Rhone
- Neder Rijn
- Neder Waal
- Neder Weser
- Mias
- Nieuw Holland
- Oranje (I) launched 1903, sold 1922, renamed Anfa
- Oranje (II) (liner, 20,000 tons, launched 1938, sold and renamed Angelina Lauro 1964, destroyed by fire 1979)
- Pieter Corneliszoon Hooft (liner launched 1925, caught fire at builders, another fire ended her career)
- Poelau Bras
- Poelau Laut
- Poelau Roebiah
- Poelau Tello
- Prins Alexander
- Prins der Nederlanden
- Prins Frederik
- Prins Hendrik (I)
- Prins Hendrik (II)
- Prins Hendrik (III) (launched 1890, sold 1907, renamed Erna
- Prins van Oranje
- Prinses Amalia
- Prinses Juliana
- Prinses Marie
- Prinses Sophie
- Prinses Wilhelmina
- Radja
- Raki
- Rembrandt
- Rempang
- Riouw
- Roebiah
- Roepat
- Rondo
- Rotti
- Salabangka
- Salawati
- Saleier
- Saparoea
- Sembilan
- Simaloer
- Singkep
- Soemba
- Soembawa
- Soenda
- Sumatra
- Tabian
- Tabinta
- Tajandoen
- Talisse
- Tanimbar
- Tarakan
- Tawali
- Timor
- Togokust
- Vondel
- Voorwaarts
- Willem II
