= USS Bali =

Dutch cargo steamship that served in the United States Navy

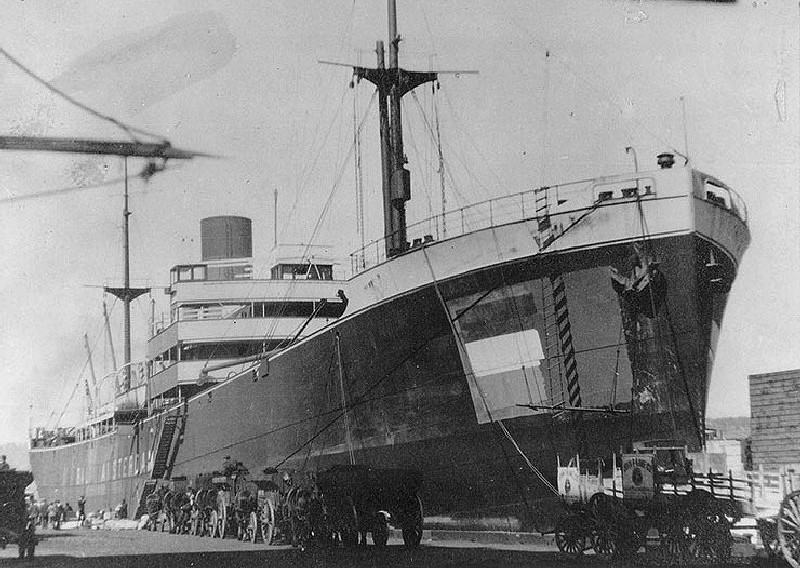
- Bali with Dutch neutrality markings in 1917 or 1918

History
- Name: 1917: Bali; 1932: Max Wolf
- Namesake: 1917: Bali
- Owner: 1917: Netherland Line; 1932: Georges Portolo
- Operator: 1918: (United States) US Navy
- Port of registry: 1917: (Netherlands) Amsterdam; 1932: (Greece) Ithaca
- Builder: Rotterdamsche Droogdok Maats
- Yard number: 56
- Laid down: 30 January 1916
- Launched: 6 January 1917
- Completed: 30 April 1917
- Acquired: by US Govt, 21 March 1918
- Commissioned: into US Navy, 27 March 1918
- Decommissioned: from US Navy, 30 May 1919
- Stricken: from US Navy, 30 May 1919
- Identification: 1917: code letters NGJR; 1918: call sign PIK; 1918: ID number ID–2483; 1932: code letters JHWF; 1934: call sign SVQI
- Fate: Sunk by aircraft, 9 June 1940

General characteristics
- Type: Cargo ship
- Tonnage: 6,694 GRT, 2,551 NRT, 9,805 DWT
- Displacement: 13,765 tons
- Length: 420.5 ft (128.2 m)
- Beam: 54.7 ft (16.7 m)
- Draught: 27 ft 7 in (8.41 m)
- Depth: 33.5 ft (10.2 m)
- Decks: 3
- Installed power: 436 NHP; 3,600 ihp
- Propulsion: 1 × screw; 1 × triple-expansion engine
- Speed: 12 knots (22 km/h)
- Capacity: cargo: 479,000 cubic feet (13,600 m^{3}) grain; 437,000 cubic feet (12,400 m^{3}) bale; passengers: 4 × 1st class
- Complement: in US Navy, 77
- Armament: July 1918: 1 × 5-inch/51-caliber gun; 1 × 6-pounder gun
- Notes: sister ship: Bintang

USS Bali was a Dutch cargo steamship that was built for Stoomvaart Mattschappij Nederland ("Netherland Line") in 1917. She served in the United States Navy, with the ID number ID–2483, from March 1918 until May 1919. She supplied the American Expeditionary Forces in France, and in 1919 she took food relief to Europe.

In 1932 Netherland Line sold her to a Greek owner, who renamed her Max Wolf. A German air raid in the Battle of France sank her in June 1940. Her wreck was scrapped after the Second World War.

== Building and identification ==
In 1916 and 1917 Rotterdamsche Droogdok Maatschappij in Rotterdam built a pair of sister ships for Netherland Line. Bintang was launched in April 1916 and completed that October. Bali was laid down as yard number 56 on 30 January 1916, but not launched until 6 January 1917. She was completed on 30 April 1917.

Bali's registered length was 420.5 ft (128.2 m), her beam was 54.7 ft (16.7 m) and her depth was 33.5 ft (10.2 m). Her tonnages were 6,694 GRT, 2,551 NRT and 9,805 DWT. Her holds had capacity for 479,000 cubic feet (13,600 m^{3}) of grain or 437,000 cubic feet (12,400 m^{3}) of baled cargo. She also had berths for four first class passengers.

Bali had a single screw, driven by a three-cylinder triple-expansion steam engine. This was rated at 436 NHP or 3,600 ihp, and gave her a speed of 12 knots (22 km/h).

Netherland Line registered Bali at Amsterdam. Her code letters were NGJR. By 1918 she was equipped for wireless telegraphy. Her call sign was PIK.

== US service ==
On 21 March 1918 the United States Customs Service seized Bali under angary at New York. She was one of 89 Dutch ships seized in US ports under Proclamation 1436, which President Woodrow Wilson had issued the previous day.

On 23 March the ship was inspected at New York Navy Yard. On 27 March she was commissioned as USS Bali (ID–2483). She was assigned to the Naval Overseas Transportation Service Army Account.

Within two hours of being commissioned, Bali was loading cargo.By 16:30 hours she had completed bunkering, and two hours later she left port in an attempt to catch up with a convoy that had left five hours earlier. However, she developed engine problems, and she anchored off Tompkinsville, Staten Island for repairs.

=== First voyage to France ===
On 9 April Bali resumed her transatlantic crossing with a later convoy, but still failed to maintain speed well enough to keep up, so on 16 April she put in to Halifax, Nova Scotia for repairs. On 28 April she resumed her voyage, on 14 May she reached Brest, France. The next day she reached Saint-Nazaire, but the port was crowded, so she had to wait for a berth, and was abler to discharge only part of her cargo. On 6 June she went up the Loire estuary to Nantes, where German prisoners of war were being used to unload ships. She discharged the rest of her cargo, and on 15 June returned down the Loire. The next day she joined a westbound convoy, which called briefly at Brest. On 18 June she left France, and on 2 July she reached Hoboken, New Jersey.

=== Second voyage to France ===
Bali loaded 6,759 tons of general cargo, and on 18 July she left port. The next day she reached Hampton Roads, Virginia and moored alongside USS Mississippi at Norfolk Navy Yard. There, Bali was fitted with one 5-inch/51-caliber gun that had been removed from the battleship Arkansas, and one 6-pounder that had been removed from the cruiser Raleigh. On the morning of 21 July she left the Navy yard and joined a convoy, which left that afternoon for France.

At sea in the North Atlantic on 8 August, Bali observed a steamship to starboard sounding a submarine warning and opening fire on a "suspicious object" in the water. Bali opened fire with her forward gun, but neither ship scored any hits. She anchored in Quiberon Bay on 10 August, continued to La Pallice, and then reached Bordeaux on 13 August. She discharged her cargo, left Bordeaux on 21 August and reached New York on 5 September.

=== Third voyage to France ===
Bali was sent to Hoboken on 6 September, where she loaded 6,887 tons of general cargo and her engine was repaired. After a trial trip on 16 September, she left on 18 September for France. On 5 October she reached Verdon Roads, where she discharged part of her cargo to a barge. On 9 October she berthed at Bordeaux to finish unloading. She waited a number of days for a return convoy to be formed. She departed west again on the afternoon of 24 October and reached New York on 7 November.

=== Horses to France ===
Word of the impending armistice with the Central Powers delayed the installation of stalls for her to transport horses. However, three days after the Armistice of 11 November 1918, she docked at the Bush Docks in Hoboken, New Jersey, where she was modified to carry 600 horses. She then embarked the animals and loaded 2,551 tons of general cargo. On 30 November she left for France. On 14 December she reached Verdon Roads on 14 December, and then went up the Gironde estuary, reaching Bordeaux on 16 December. There she discharged her cargo and loaded steel rails for ballast. Two days after Christmas 1918 she returned down the Gironde to start her return voyage to the US.

Bali anchored in Hampton Roads late on 11 January 1919, and moored at Newport News, Virginia, the next day. Workmen came aboard and removed the horse stalls on 13 and 14 January. On the afternoon of 15 January she entered the shipyard Newport News Shipbuilding & Dry Dock, where her guns were removed.

=== Collision with Bonafan ===
On 23 January she moved to the Engineer Depot dock at Lambert's Point, where she unloaded her steel rail ballast. On 28 January berthed off Sewall's Point. The next day, a flood tide and strong breeze caused her to drag her anchors and drift down on the cargo ship Bonafan. The collision caused little damage to either ship, and Bali steamed away under her own power. After bunkering on 31 January, she sailed for Baltimore on 3 February.

=== Transfer to US Shipping Board ===
On 1 February 1919 Bali was transferred from the NOTS Army Account to the Shipping Board Account. On 4 February she reached Baltimore. There she loaded 7,458 tons of US Food Administration flour, peas, and beans for European relief, and had "otter gear" installed for minesweeping. On 14 February she left Baltimore, and on 7 March she reached Copenhagen, where she discharged her cargo.

On 20 March she left Denmark for England. She went via the Kiel Canal and Heligoland, and on 23 March reached Great Yarmouth to await a pilot. She continued to Harwich, and was in Plymouth from 25 to 29 March. She returned to the US in ballast, reached New York on 10 April, and moored at Jersey City, New Jersey that afternoon. She moved to the Morgan Pier on 17 April and Shewan's Drydock on 19 April, where she was repaired on 19 and 20 April.

=== Final voyage and decommissioning ===
On 22 April Bali moved to the West Shore Railroad Dock, where she loaded a cargo of lard and flour. She left on 29 April, called briefly at Falmouth for orders on 11 May, and reached Hamburg on the morning of 16 May.

On the morning of 24 May Bali reached Amsterdam. On 27 May she entered the Amsterdamsche Drydock Company's dry dock. At Amsterdam on 30 May 1919 she was simultaneously decommissioned, struck from the Navy list, and returned to her owners.

== Later career ==
Bali resumed civilian service with Netherland Line. On 22 March 1932 Georges Potolo acquired her, renamed her Max Wolf, and registered her in Ithaca, in the Ionian Islands of Greece. Her Greek code letters were JHWF, but by 1934 they were replaced with the four-letter call sign SVQI.

In the Second World War a German air raid on 9 June 1940 sank Bali in the Seine, killing two of her crew. Sources disagree as to whether she sank at Rouen or was beached near Berville-sur-Seine. During the subsequent German occupation of France, the Luftwaffe used her wreck for target practice. After the war, according to one source, her wreck was beached on 16 August 1946 to be scrapped. According to other sources, she was scrapped about 1951.

== Bibliography ==
- Lloyd's Register of Shipping. Vol. II.–Steamers. London: Lloyd's Register of Shipping. 1919 – via Internet Archive.
- Lloyd's Register of Shipping (PDF). Vol. II.–Steamers and Motorships of 300 Tons Gross and Over. London: Lloyd's Register of Shipping. 1933 – via Southampton City Council.
- Lloyd's Register of Shipping (PDF). Vol. II.–Steamers and Motorships of 300 Tons Gross and Over. London: Lloyd's Register of Shipping. 1934 – via Southampton City Council.
- The Marconi Press Agency Ltd (1918). The Year Book of Wireless Telegraphy and Telephony. London: The Wireless Press, Ltd.
