= SS Prins van Oranje =

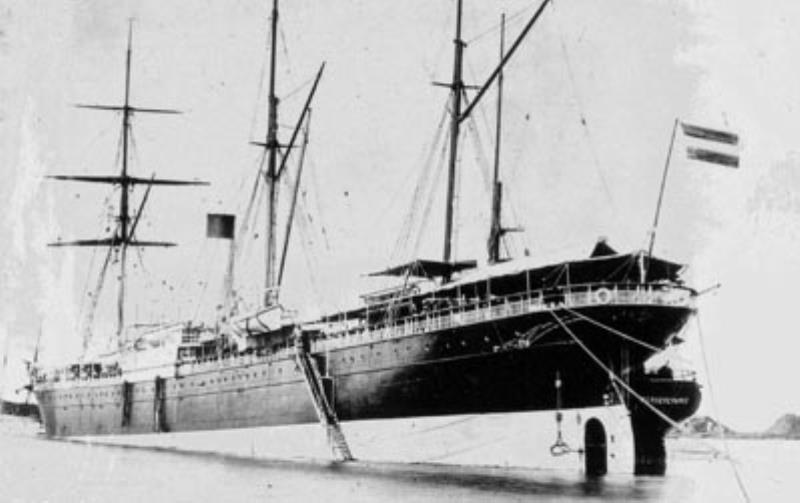
- SS Prins van Oranje before 1876. Probably fixing her propeller.

History

Netherlands
- Name: SS Prins van Oranje
- Owner: Stoomvaart Maatschappij Nederland
- Ordered: May 1870
- Cost: 930,000 guilders
- Yard number: 131
- Laid down: 1870
- Launched: 4 May 1871
- Fate: Broken up 1903

General characteristics
- Type: Passenger liner
- Tonnage: 2,789 GRT
- Displacement: 4,860 tons (loaded); 2.260 tons (empty)
- Length: 321 ft 5 in (98.0 m)
- Beam: 39 ft 5 in (12.0 m)
- Draught: 6.7 metres (22.0 ft) (loaded); 3.8 metres (12.5 ft) (empty)
- Depth of hold: 29 ft 3 in (8.9 m) (to spar deck)
- Installed power: 1,600 ihp (1,200 kW)
- Propulsion: Single screw
- Sail plan: 3-masted barque
- Speed: 10.5 knots (19.4 km/h; 12.1 mph)(loaded); 12.3 knots (22.8 km/h; 14.2 mph)(empty)
- Complement: 90

SS Prins van Oranje was the second ship of the Willem III class. It was the first ship of the Stoomvaart Maatschappij Nederland (SMN) that completed a round trip to the Dutch East Indies.

== Context ==
=== Steamships for the Suez Canal ===
SS Prins van Oranje was the second ship of the Willem III class, which were the first ships built for the Stoomvaart Maatschappij Nederland (SMN). The SMN was founded in May 1870 for the express purpose of establishing a steam shipping line to Java via the Suez Canal, which opened in 1869. This would require steamships of a 'new' class, the Willem III class.

== Characteristics ==
=== Dimensions ===
SS Prins van Oranje was reported to measure 320 * 39 * 30 feet. The cargo size of the ship was 2,789 tons GT. Tideman has general data about Prins van Oranje that is probably more exact: 97.53 m from bow to stern. Beam 11.96 m external. Depth of hold 9.775 m. Draught 6.7 m. .

=== Machinery ===
The compound steam engines were also delivered by the shipyard. They were of the improved Wolf system of nominal 400 hp, effective 1,600 ihp. The reporter A. Huet gave a simple explanation of the compound engine: Four boilers created steam with an over-pressure of 2 atm and pushed it into a small cylinder. In this cylinder the steam expanded to create movement. The steam then went to a reservoir and emerged in a bigger cylinder, where it again expanded to create movement. The steam then went to the surface condenser to become water. The explanation continued by stating that compound engines had been made before in the Netherlands for river tugboats by Fijenoord. John Elder was credited with making it suitable for use at sea, and improving and simplifying the concept so that it really delivered the advantages that calculations promised.

The crucial aspect of the compound engine for use at sea was that using high pressure steam required the boilers to be fed with pure water. In order to achieve this, the cooling in the condenser was achieved by running the steam through metal tubes, which were kept cold by water that streamed outside of these pipes. By not mixing the steam with the cooling water, the result was that the steam became distilled water, that was fed back to the boilers. The result was a closed circuit between boilers and machine. Our reporter noted that even this surface condenser was not new, but had been invented 20–30 years earlier, and had fallen in disuse since.

On the Glasgow to Nieuwediep route SS Prins van Oranje has used about 20 tons a day at a speed of 10 Knots an hour.

=== Accommodation ===
There was accommodation for 90 passengers first class, and 36 passengers second class. For both Willem III and Prins van Oranje the two major changes from the design as presented to the government were: engines of 400 nominal hp instead of 325 hp and capacity for 90 passengers first class, instead of 50 passengers first class.

In 1875 the accommodation was radically changed, cf below.

=== Complement ===
The crew of Prins van Oranje consisted of 69 persons, but this was probably not counting civilian staff.

== Service ==
=== Construction and transfer ===
Prins van Oranje was built for Stoomvaart Maatschappij Nederland (SMN) by John Elder & Co. of Govan on the River Clyde. She was launched on Thursday 4 May 1871. On 29 June she left the shipyard in Glasgow to take in coal and make a trial run on the Clyde. On the trial run she was reported to have made 12 knots. It is traditionally the moment before ownership is transferred. On 8 July she finally left Glasgow for Nieuwediep. The voyage from Glasgow to Nieuwediep was made in 76 hours. In the evening of 11 July 1871 Prins van Oranje arrived in Texel, i.e. before Nieuwediep under Captain M.C. Braat.

=== First Voyage to the East Indies ===
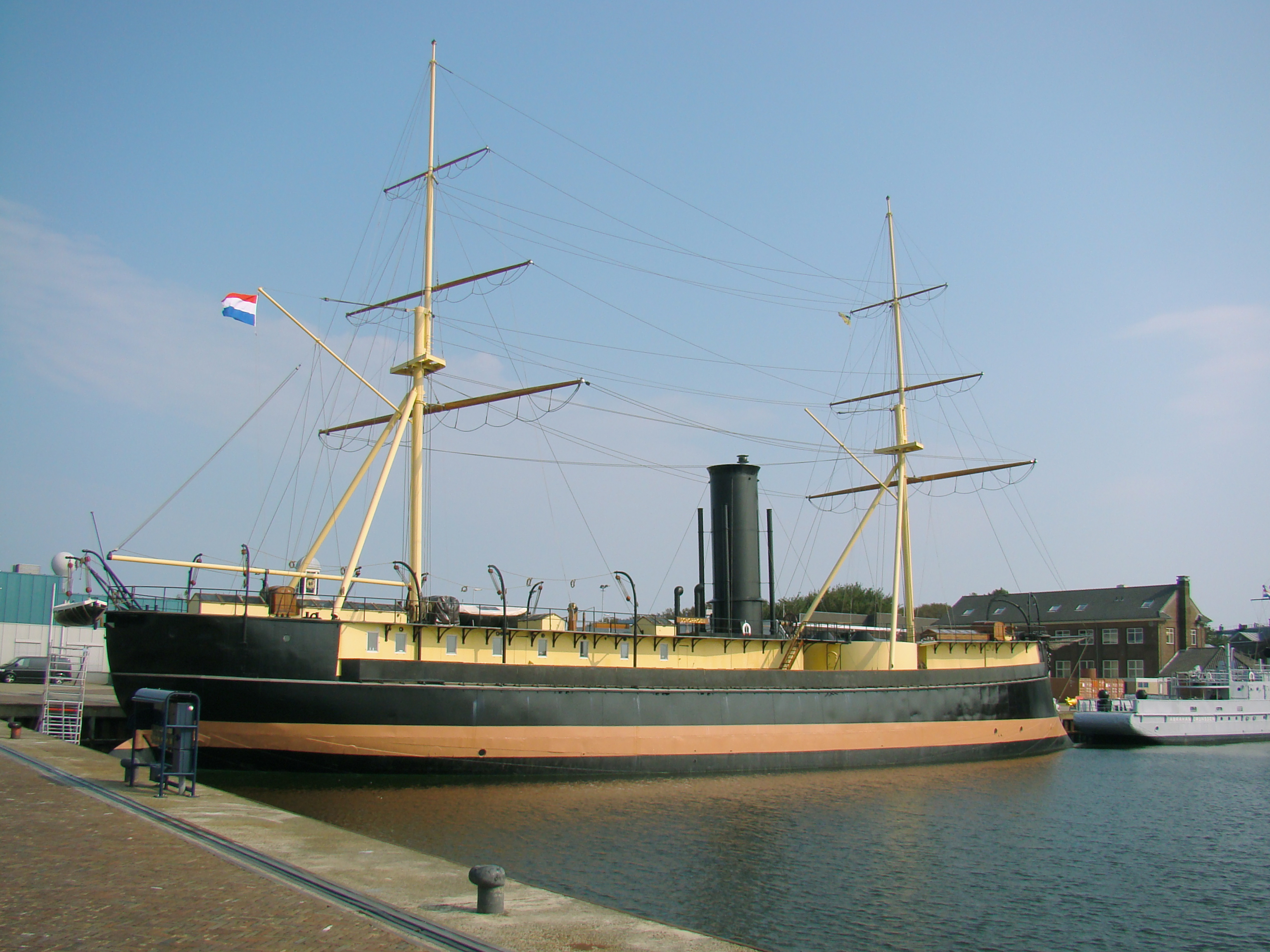
HNLMS Schorpioen escorted Prins van Oranje out

The first voyage of Prins van Oranje to the Dutch East Indies consisted of a speedy voyage to Batavia, and a very bad return trip. Prins van Oranje had entered the harbor of Nieuwediep on 12 July. Her departure was determined on 25 July. Now the usual loading of packages from the warehouses of the SMN took place, and all kinds of small vessels arrived to transload their cargo. Problems with loading or otherwise cause that departure was soon delayed to 29 July. Still somewhat later it became 'end of July'. On 27 July Prins Hendrik arrived in Nieuwediep to inspect the ship.

At 5 AM on 30 July 1871 Prins van Oranje left from before Nieuwediep under Captain M.C. Braat. Prins Hendrik accompanied her for a while on HNLMS Schorpioen. On board were at least some of the passengers which had survived the disaster of Willem III. Among them Captain Pieter van der Velden Erdbrink, lieutenant 2nd class M.J.C. Lucardie and Miss Cornelia van Geuns. The cargo was very diverse, there were many industrial goods, but also wine, butter and cheese.

In the afternoon of Sunday 13 August 1871 Prins van Oranje arrived in Port Said. After passing the Suez Canal she left Suez for Batavia on 18 August. On 9 September at 8 AM she passed Anyer on Sunda Strait, and at two o'clock in the afternoon she anchored before Batavia. The trip had taken 41 days and 9 hours.

The steam vessel Tjiliwong was sent from Batavia to collect passengers. Captain Braat received a congratulatory telegram from Prins Hendrik. On 15 September the Governor-General visited Prins van Oranje. On 17 September the steam vessels Tjitarum and Tjiliwong would transport more than 600 visitors to the ship. On 21 September Prins van Oranje left Batavia for Semarang.

At 10 AM on 22 September Prins van Oranje arrived in Semarang. A number of people visited her by using the steam vessel Moria, and there was a reception with champagne. A local newspaper made a report about Prins van Oranje. It noted that the ship was a modern vessel capable of efficiently transporting cargo between the Netherlands and the Dutch East Indies. With regard to passenger transport however, it thought that it could not compare to the ships of the Messageries Maritimes. Even its less opulent Meikong and Ava were far more comfortable and better ventilated. Even so, there were more aspects in which the French ships were better. On Sunday 1 October Prins van Oranje was open for the general public in Semarang, and on 2 October she left for Batavia.

On 4 October 1871 Prins van Oranje arrived back in Batavia. For the return voyage she left Batavia on 15 October. She had primarily been loaded in Semarang. While there 3,000 piculs sugar and 14,500 piculs coffee had been loaded for the Netherlands Trading Society. For other traders from Semarang she carried: 4,200 piculs coffee, 4,570 kg of indigo, 5.5 piculs nutmeg, 1.75 piculs cinnamon, 0.75 piculs mace, 12 piculs gutta-percha. In Batavia 1,923 piculs of tin, 73,269 pounds of tea, 785 kg indigo, 870 pounds vanilla, 23 piculs of coffee and some other goods were added. There were 29 passengers and 79 soldiers on board.

On 9 November Prins van Oranje arrived in Suez. During the passing of the Suez Canal the troubles began. On the 13th she was in Port Said with one or more broken propeller blades. One expected that this would cause her to remain in Port Said for a few days. On Friday 17 November she indeed left Port Said. On 2 December she arrived in Gibraltar with engine problems, others said screw blade problems. Some of the cargo of Prins van Oranje was transferred to the English Brig Thomas and John, so the necessary repairs could be made. By 8 December 1871 a telegram had been received which noted that the repair to the movement of the 'steam slide' would be done, and that some cargo from the stern of the ship had been moved to lighters, so the two propeller blades, which had been damaged in the Suez Canal, could be replaced. The photograph above might depict this event. The passengers continued to the Netherlands on another ship. On 23 December Prins van Oranje left Gibraltar, and on 30 December 1871 she finally arrived back in Texel.

Prins van Oranje had completed the first direct round trip to the East Indies for the SMN. However, the trouble with the engine and propeller on the home bound voyage, meant that there was little reason for rejoicing. The net result of the first voyage was a loss of 9,104 guilders. It was one of the reasons that an extraordinary meeting of shareholders was convened on 25 March 1872. The bleak picture resulted from some matters of integrity, the burning of Willem III, the loss made on the first trip of Prins van Oranje, the bad start of the second trip of that ship, and the propeller blade problems of Prins Hendrik. It all caused quite a row in the meeting and outside of it.

=== Second voyage ===
The second voyage of Prins van Oranje to the Dutch East Indies was even worse than the first. The propeller blades broke on the trip towards Batavia, and even twice on the home-bound voyage. On 4 February 1872 Prins van Oranje left on her second trip. On 18 February she arrived in Port Said. On 21 February she left Suez. Prins van Oranje then somehow again broke her propeller blades. Captain Braat noted that the accident took place on 3 degrees north, 63 degrees east. In quick succession he lost three of the four propeller blades, and then changed course on 4 March. On 12 March Prins van Oranje was in Galle, Sri Lanka to get new propeller blades. By 19 March the propeller had been repaired, and some cargo was re-loaded into the ship. In the early morning of 24 March Prins van Oranje left Galle for Batavia.

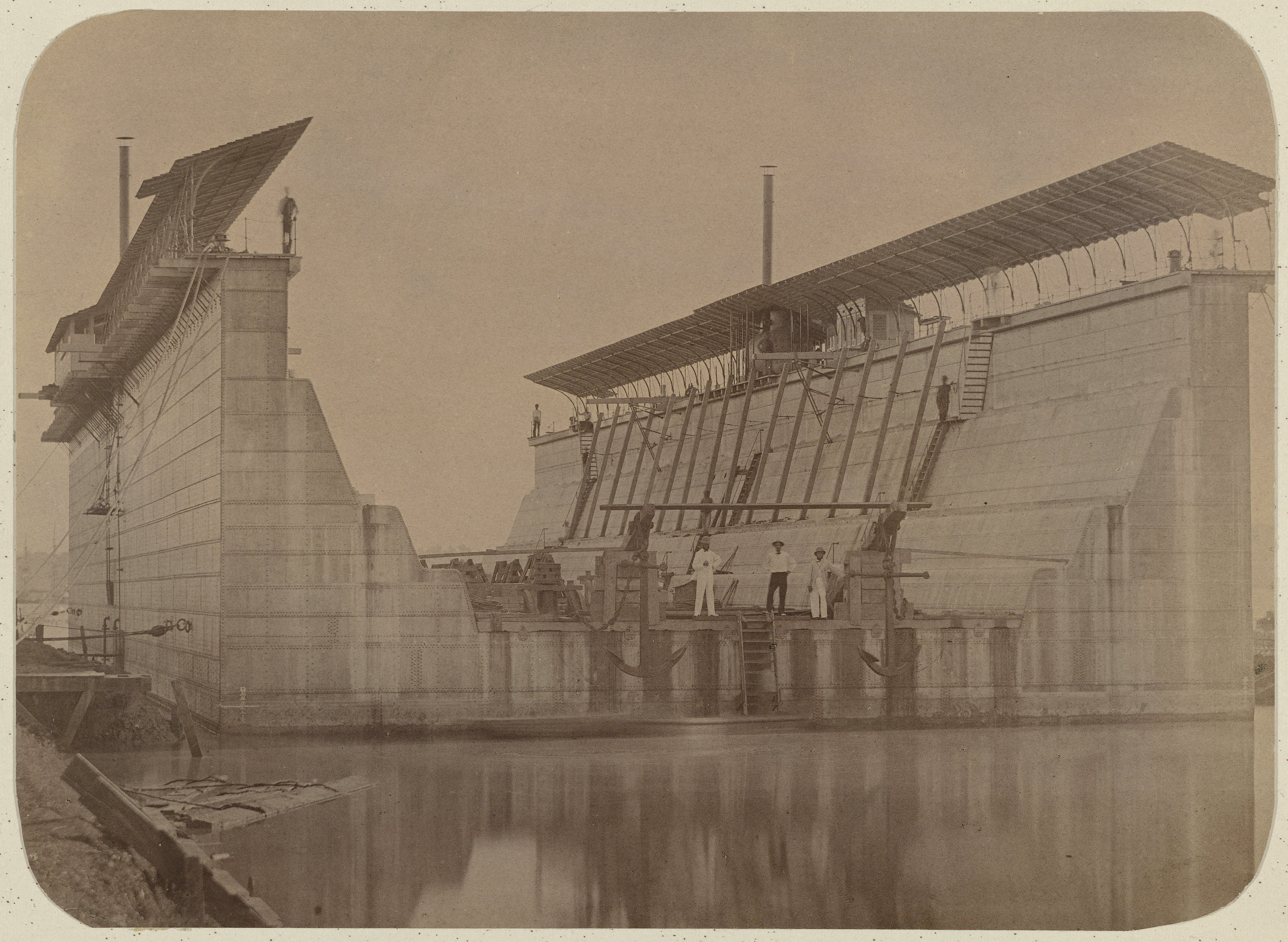
Onrust Dock of 3,000 tons would lift Prins van Oranje out of the water

On 1 April 1872 Prins van Oranje arrived in Batavia. In Batavia she unloaded a very diverse cargo; clothes, books, utensils, liquor etc. Cargo destined for Semarang was transloaded to SS Koning Willem III. Prins van Oranje then entered Onrust Dock of 3,000 tons to fix her propeller blades, including the one that had still been attached after Galle. Engineer D. Boeke of the naval base at Onrust Island later gave some observations. He noted that the connection of the propeller blades to the axis was found to be solid and well-designed. The blades had broken off at about one-third of their length from the axis, so the defect was in the form, the size, or the materials used. At the moment of the inspection Boeke and others still thought that the Suez Canal played an essential role in the problem, because other companies had also gotten into trouble there.

Prins van Oranje continued to Surabaya on 16 April. She arrived there on 18 April. On the way back from Surabaya halted a few hours to pick passengers in Semarang. On 30 April she was back in Batavia.

On 8 May Prins van Oranje left Batavia again with about 300 people on board. In the night of 17–18 May one of the propeller blades broke off near 6.59 N 68.52 E. Prins van Oranje continued at a careful pace, some passengers noting increased vibrations. On 22 May she had reached 1.57 N 57.10 E, when at 2 o'clock in the afternoon another screw blade was lost. Because this was opposite the first one that was lost, the vibrations actually diminished. In the night of 24–25 May the third blade was lost with a sound that woke most of the passengers. By then Prins van Oranje was at 5.40 N 54.13 E, about 740 km from Cape Guardafui in Somalia. The chance of discovery by passing ships was by then much better. In order to re-assure the passengers they were reminded that on the way to Galle the last blade had lasted for 8 days. Now a southwestern wind came up which greatly aided the screw. On 26 May Cape Guardafui came in sight, and soon the ship was in the Gulf of Aden. In the morning of 28 May Prins van Oranje was 200 kilometers from Aden. In the evening of 28 May all passengers were assembled on deck after dinner. Suddenly the last propeller blade then broke with an enormous noise.

When the lase propeller blade broke off the rocks of Aden were about 90–110 km away, and already in view. The ship came to a halt almost immediately, and the passengers could then contemplate what would have there faith if it had happened 10 days earlier. Because there was no wind the use of the sails was not an option. One of the boats was launched to get help in Aden. By luck already on the next morning, SS Riga from Leith came into view. Prins van Oranje hoisted a signal flag, and Riga changed course. After some negotiations Riga took Prins van Oranje into tow to Aden, where both arrived at two o'clock in the afternoon of 29 May. Two passengers then left Aden on the Ava of the Messageries Maritimes, and noted that ship and service were better and cost less.

After a telegram from Aden, four propeller blades were immediately dispatched from Port Said. After repairs she left Aden in the evening of 13 June for Suez. At 3 AM on 15 June she arrived in Suez. Others say this was on 21 June. As the distance between Aden and Suez is about 3,000 km, a ship that has a speed of 19 km/h would take 157 hours, or 6.5 days, so 21 June is correct. In the Suez Canal Prins van Oranje again broke three propeller blades. On 27 June she was unloading in Port Said, so the propeller could be repaired. On 14 July new propeller blades had again been attached. By then there had been so much delay that sister ship SS Conrad, which had left for the East Indies after Prins van Oranje had overtaken her. SS Conrad left Port Said on 9 July, before Prins van Oranje, and took some of her passengers. On 20 July at 6 AM Prins van Oranje left Port Said for Nieuwediep. On 29 July she passed Gibraltar. On 1 August she arrived in Vigo, another sign of trouble. She left Vigo on 4 August. In the evening of 7 August she was near Dungeness, Kent. On 8 August she arrived in Nieuwediep.

Engineer Boeke, who had seen the repairs at Onrust, made some further notes after the incident on the way to Aden. It was clear that Prins van Oranje had now lost a number of propeller blades which had never been in the Suez Canal. It was also remarkable that the SMN seemed to be the only shipping line which had so much trouble with breaking propeller blades, even while she used the same material that other companies used. He suspected that the cause of the breaking blades was in the very long stretches that the SMN ships steamed without pause. A critic noted that the propeller blades were of the Hirsch form. With that form, cast iron was not a recommended metal. Instead wrought iron or cast steel should have been used, or another type of blade should have been used. He continued with fierce reproaches on the technical management of the SMN, which should have taken measures way earlier, instead of blaming the trouble on accidentally hitting the ground or unknown wrecks.

=== Later voyages ===
The third voyage of Prins van Oranje started when she left Texel on 5 October 1872 under Captain E.W. Fabritius. On 18 October she arrived in Port Said. On 22 October she left Suez for Batavia. On 12 November 1872 she arrived in Batavia on the fastest voyages till then, 37 days and 20 hours. On 22 November she continued to Surabaya, from whence she left again on 1 December. After a stop in Samarang she arrived back in Batavia on 10 December. On 18 December Prins van Oranje left Batavia again for Nieuwediep. In the morning of 9 January 1873 she arrived in Suez. On 14 January she left Port Said. On 2 February 1873 Prins van Oranje arrived in Texel at 9 AM. There was trouble with floating ice, but at 12 o'clock she was on the quay in Nieuwediep.

On 6 March 1873 Prins van Oranje left Texel again for her fourth voyage. On 20 March she reached Port Said. In the canal she was hindered by ships that were stuck, and it was 27 March before she left Suez for Batavia. On 17 April she anchored before Batavia. A special part of her cargo consisted of a machine gun, 1,000 barrels of gunpowder, 250,000 beaumont rifle cartridges, and a detachment of 125 troops. After visiting Surabaya Prins van Oranje captain Fabricius returned to Batavia, and left from there on 22 May. On 16 June she arrived in Suez, and on 18 June she was in Port Said, planning to leave from there on the 19th. On 5 July Prins van Oranje arrived back in Nieuwdiep. It was clear that the propeller blade problems had been fixed.

On her fifth trip Prins van Oranje got an even bigger role in the Aceh War. She was to leave after a short turn around time on 5 August, and to transport 300 troops. She would also transport another shipment of Beaumont rifles and ammunition. On 5 August 1873 she left Nieuwediep. On 19 August she arrived in Port Said, and on the 23rd she left Suez for Batavia. On 15 September Prins van Oranje captain Fabritius arrived in Batavia with the troops.

=== Reconstruction by John Elder ===
Perhaps the SMN took notice of the criticism about the accommodation on board Prins van Oranje. In 1875 she was changed at John Elder's shipyard. The change consisted of changing almost the whole first class accommodation behind the boilers to cargo space, but with retention of the portholes, so this area could also be used to transport soldiers. The cabins before the boilers were made into second class accommodation. A new first class accommodation was built upon the deck. It consisted of a spacious saloon, and cabins for 57 first class passengers. This number of first class passengers was significantly less than the 90 carried previously, but ventilation might have been the prime reason to move them one deck up. The old 2nd class accommodation had been joined to the troop quarters, making it possible to transport 550 soldiers.

On 7 August 1875 Prins van Oranje left Nieuwediep with: a full cargo, 50 first class passengers, 35 second class passengers, and 275 soldiers. At that moment all 6 SMN ships were in service, and their capacity to move troops was noted as 2,700 soldiers with the required officers and non commanding officers.

=== Accident in Indian Ocean ===
On New Year's Day 1900 Prins van Oranje broke her propeller shaft while steaming west of Sumatra at 1°8′0″N 90°23′0″E The current was at first S.W. then S.. later S.S.E. and E.N.E. Therefore Prins van Oranje drifted as far south as 0°13' S and as far west as 90° E. On 4 January 2 officer H. Smitt proposed to send a well equipped boat to Padang to get help. Captain Potjer reasoned that there was no reason to do so, because the ship did not make water and had provisions that would last for months (she was a freighter at the time).

Nevertheless, starboard boat I was provisioned with much food, high quality fresh water, double sails etc. etc. In the afternoon of 4 January it left with H. Smitt, second engineer T. Zuidema, 3rd officer H. Harms, 3rd engineer J. Ages, midshipman C.G.H. Keipin, and sailors C. Kort and A.W. Reekers. In the afternoon the boat was lowered and started to Padang. The idea was to sail / row E.N.E. to a position on the line Pulau Bodjo (one of the Batu Islands) - Point de Galle (Sri Lanka) in order to meet ships.

On 9 January 1900 Prins van Oranje saw a steamer while at 0° S 90°9" E. She fired signal shots and hoisted signal flags, but was not noticed. On 14 January 6:45 AM the crew sighted Prinses Sophie of the SMN. In turn the crew of Prinses Sophie noted Prins van Oranje on 0°5" N 91°35" E, 132 Geographical miles from Padang.

Captain Soomer of Prinses Sophie had been in Padang on 12 January when the SMN sent a telegram ordering him to search for Prins van Oranje. He made a plan to sail in the direction, and then to follow the streams that could have caught Prins van Oranje. A big basket was hoisted in the foremast for a lookout, who would get 100 guilders if he saw the ship. Sailor A. Andersen was as lucky to first see Prins van Oranje on 14 January.

Prinses Sophie now took Prins van Oranje in tow, and with a speed of 9 knots they went to look for the boat. Rewards were again promised, now by both captains, and by the passengers of Prinses Sophie who promised champagne if the boat was found. In the night of 15–16 January a big white light was seen. Soon after a red light showed, and at 3 in the night the boat was alongside Prins van Oranje. By 4 in the night the boat had been hoisted back on Prins van Oranje. In the morning of 17 January at 7 o'clock both ships were in the Emma harbor in Padang.

Captain Potjer noted that the boat had done very well. The sustained heavy rain had been very uncomfortable, but the boat had profited from the accompanying winds. The contrary current and lack of wind were the only reason that the boat had not yet reached its destination. A few days later SS Madura towed Prins van Oranje to Batavia.

== Italian Service ==
=== Sold to an Italian company ===
On 2 July 1900 Prins van Oranje was auctioned, but did not get sold. A few days later ship broker W. de Lorme van Rossem sold her to a Genovese company for 7,750 GBP (93,000 guilders). The Italian company would rename her Maria On 26 July Maria left IJmuiden for Cardiff.
