= Rondo (disambiguation) =

Rondo is a musical refrain form.

Rondo may also refer to:

== Arts and entertainment ==
=== Music ===
- Rondò, a two-part operatic vocal form
- Rondo (group), Moscow rock band
- Gene Rondo, stage name of Jamaican reggae singer Winston Lara (1943–1994)
- "Rondo", a song by Cirque du Soleil from Mystere
- "Rondo", a song by 6ix9ine from Day69

=== Other arts and entertainment ===
- Rondo (1966 film), a Yugoslavian film
- Rondo (2018 film), an American thriller
- Rondo (series), a fantasy adventure series by Emily Rodda

== Places ==
=== United States ===
- Rondo, Arkansas, a town
- Rondo neighborhood, Saint Paul, Minnesota
- Rondo, Michigan, an unincorporated community
- Rondo, Missouri, an unincorporated community
- Rondo, Virginia, an unincorporated community

=== Elsewhere ===
- Rondo Island, Indonesia
- Rondo Plateau, Tanzania

== People ==
- Rondo (name), a list of people with the surname or given name

== Ships ==
- USS Rondo (SP-90), a patrol boat in commission from 1917 to 1919
- USS Rondo (ID-2488), a cargo ship in commission from 1918 to 1919
- SS Rondo, a steam cargo ship launched in 1917

== Other uses ==
- Kia Rondo, a nameplate for the Kia Carens compact car
- Rondo Theatre, Bath, England
- Rondo (game), a training drill in association football
- Rondo (grape), a dark-skinned grape variety
- Rondo (soft drink), a citrus-flavored soft drink
- Rondo (confectionery), a candy brand
- Rondo dwarf galago or bushbaby, a primate species of Tanzania
- Rondo blind snake, a snake species
- Rondo, a variety of the Dutch pastry gevulde koek

== See also ==
- Rondo Days festival, in Saint Paul, Minnesota, US
- Rondo 1, an office building in Warsaw, Poland
- Old Rondo (disambiguation)
