= USS Rondo =

USS Rondo has been the name of more than one United States Navy ship, and may refer to:

- USS Rondo (SP-90), later USS SP-90, a patrol boat in commission from 1917 to 1919
- USS Rondo (ID-2488), a cargo ship in commission from 1918 to 1919
