= Game Night (film) =

2018 film by John Francis Daley and Jonathan Goldstein

- Theatrical release poster
- Directed by: John Francis Daley; Jonathan Goldstein
- Written by: Mark Perez
- Produced by: John Davis; John Fox; Jason Bateman; James Garavente
- Starring: Jason Bateman; Rachel McAdams
- Cinematography: Barry Peterson
- Edited by: Jamie Gross; Gregory Plotkin; David Egan
- Music by: Cliff Martinez
- Production companies: New Line Cinema; Davis Entertainment; Aggregate Films
- Distributed by: Warner Bros. Pictures
- Release date: February 23, 2018 (United States)
- Running time: 100 minutes
- Country: United States
- Language: English
- Budget: $37 million
- Box office: $122.8 million

Game Night is a 2018 American action comedy film directed by John Francis Daley and Jonathan Goldstein and written by Mark Perez. It stars Jason Bateman and Rachel McAdams, and the film's supporting cast includes Billy Magnussen, Sharon Horgan, Lamorne Morris, Kylie Bunbury, Jesse Plemons, Michael C. Hall, and Kyle Chandler.

The film follows a group of friends whose game night turns into a real-life mystery after one of them is kidnapped.

Warner Bros. Pictures released the film on February 23, 2018. It received positive reviews from critics and has grossed $122 million worldwide. Plemons was nominated for the Detroit Film Critics Society Award for Best Supporting Actor.

== Plot ==
Max and Annie Davis are avid gamers who met at bar trivia and became engaged during charades. The couple's plans for a baby are complicated by Max's feelings of inadequacy compared to his successful brother, Brooks.

The couple regularly hosts game nights with their friend Ryan and married couple Kevin and Michelle Sterling, while struggling to keep them secret from their socially awkward police officer neighbor Gary Kingsbury, especially after his painful divorce from their friend Debbie. Brooks arrives in Max's dream car, humiliates him with a childhood story, and offends Annie (who assumed Max was overthinking his issues with Brooks) by offering to host the next game night himself.

When the guests, including Ryan's new date Sarah, arrive at Brooks's rental house, he reveals he has initiated an interactive role-playing mystery game. The winner is promised his Corvette. An actor enters to begin the game, but is knocked unconscious by two masked men who kidnap Brooks.

Believing this is part of the game, the couples passively observe the fight and split up to solve the mystery. Ryan and Sarah visit the role-playing company's office to offer a bribe for the final clue. When Kevin and Michelle talk to the actor, they realize Brooks's abduction was real.

Max and Annie track Brooks's phone to a bar and use the gun Brooks dropped to hold his captors at gunpoint and free him. When she accidentally shoots Max in the arm, they realize they are in danger. They flee as Brooks confesses that he is a black marketeer: he procured a Fabergé egg for a criminal known as "the Bulgarian" but instead sold it to someone with the alias "Marlon Freeman". With his kidnappers in pursuit, Brooks jumps out of the car so Max and Annie can get away.

The couples regroup and, unable to go to the police, decide to recover the egg from Freeman to deliver to the Bulgarian. They show up at Gary's and distract him with the pretense of a game night while Max uses his police computer to discover Freeman's real name, Donald Anderton, and address. After Max bleeds on Gary's white dog and a shrine dedicated to Debbie, the group leaves and receives the kidnappers' call to meet them in one hour.

They sneak into Anderton's mansion, where he is hosting an underground fight club. Searching for the egg, Michelle reveals to Kevin that years ago she once slept with Denzel Washington while they were briefly separated, but Kevin determines him to be a look-alike after seeing a photo. Separately, Max tells Annie he may not be ready to have a child. Ryan spots the egg in an open safe, leading to a game of keep away with Anderton's guards. The group escapes with the egg but accidentally breaks it, revealing a list inside.

The group meets with Brooks and his captors, only to be captured themselves. Brooks reveals that he has always been jealous of Max's life and intended for him to win the Corvette all along. Gary saves them but is shot in the chest. Max and Annie comfort him by promising to invite him to every future game night, then he reveals that he faked the entire abduction — including hiring the kidnappers — to trick them into letting him rejoin game night.

Gary is, however, unaware of the list, which he recognizes as a WITSEC list. Gary is shot in the back, and the group finds themselves cornered by the real Bulgarian. Max offers the list in exchange for their lives, but Brooks, thinking they will all be killed anyway, swallows the list so is taken to the Bulgarian's plane. Max and Annie race to the airport in the Corvette, stop the plane, subdue the Bulgarian and his henchmen, and rescue Brooks; Max realizes he wants to be a father after all.

Three months later, Brooks is under house arrest for his crimes and has sold the list on the black market for $3 million (after tipping off the witnesses for $20,000 each). He hosts a game night for the group, including Gary, and Annie reveals she is pregnant through a game of Pictionary as armed men arrive outside.

In the post-credits scene, Debbie encounters the Denzel Washington lookalike.

== Cast ==
- Jason Bateman as Max Davis, Annie's husband
- Rachel McAdams as Annie Davis, Max's wife
- Billy Magnussen as Ryan Huddle, one of Max and Annie's friends
- Sharon Horgan as Sarah Darcy, Ryan's co-worker and love interest
- Lamorne Morris as Kevin Sterling, Michelle's husband
- Kylie Bunbury as Michelle Sterling, Kevin's wife
- Jesse Plemons as Gary Kingsbury, Max and Annie's neighbor
- Chelsea Peretti as Glenda
- Danny Huston as Donald Anderton
- Michael C. Hall as The Bulgarian
- Kyle Chandler as Brooks Davis, Max's brother

Additionally, the film's directors John Francis Daley and Jonathan Goldstein cameo as Carter and Dan, respectively. Kenny (credited as "Not Denzel") is portrayed by Malcolm X. Hughes, a part-time Denzel Washington impersonator. Michael Cyril Creighton appears as a game night friend, Bill. Jeffrey Wright makes an uncredited cameo as an actor playing Agent Ron Henderson. Former wrestler Jaxson Ryker appears as Bulgarian Goon, an assistant of The Bulgarian.

Olivia, a West Highland White Terrier, played a role in the film as Bastian, Gary's pet dog.

== Production ==
The film was dedicated to stunt performer John Bernecker who worked on the film as Joshua Mikel's double. Bernecker died after an accident while filming The Walking Dead.

=== Development ===
Producer John Fox had the film's title and asked screenwriter Mark Perez for story ideas. Perez took inspiration from films like Three Amigos and Tropic Thunder. He pitched the concept to 20th Century Fox, who liked it. The two pitched the project to Jason Bateman, who also liked it. They then sold the idea to New Line Cinema around 2013–2014. Bateman was initially slated to direct, as well as produce and star in the film. When screenwriters Jonathan Goldstein and John Francis Daley were hired to rewrite Perez's script, it became clear to Bateman that the two would also want to direct the film, so Bateman stepped down.

=== Pre-production ===
On May 24, 2016, New Line Cinema hired Goldstein and Francis Daley to rewrite and direct the film Game Night, which Jason Bateman produced through Aggregate Films. While Daley and Goldstein did not receive screenwriter credit, they later said they rewrote "almost all of the original script’s dialogue, totally overhauled the characters — most notably a creepy cop portrayed by Jesse Plemons — and comprehensively reworked the original script’s third act."

In January 2017, Rachel McAdams, Bateman, and Plemons were cast in the film's lead roles. In February 2017, Kylie Bunbury joined the cast, while in March, Lamorne Morris, Billy Magnussen, Kyle Chandler, and Sharon Horgan were also added. In April 2017, Jeffrey Wright was cast in the film as an FBI agent, a role he ultimately played uncredited.

=== Filming ===
Principal photography on the film began in early April 2017 in Atlanta, Georgia, US.

== Release ==
Warner Bros. Pictures had originally scheduled Game Night for release on February 14, 2018. The date was later pushed back to March 2, 2018, before being moved up to February 23, 2018.

=== Home media ===
Game Night was released digitally on May 4, 2018, and released on Blu-ray and DVD on May 22, 2018. The film was later released on 4K-UHD on August 13, 2024.

== Reception ==
=== Box office ===
Game Night grossed $69.3 million in the United States and Canada, and $53.5 million in other territories, for a worldwide total of $122.8 million, against a production budget of $37 million.

In the United States and Canada, Game Night was released alongside Annihilation and Every Day, and was projected to gross $13–21 million from 3,488 theaters in its opening weekend. The film made $5.6 million on its first day (including $1 million from Thursday night previews). It ended up grossing $17 million over the weekend, finishing second, behind holdover Black Panther. The film dropped 38.8% (above average for a comedy) in its second weekend to $10.4 million, and finished fourth, behind Black Panther and newcomers Red Sparrow and Death Wish. It made $7.9 million in its third weekend, $5.6 million in its fourth and $4.1 million in its fifth.

=== Critical response ===
On Rotten Tomatoes, the film holds an approval rating of 85% based on 257 reviews, with an average rating of 6.9/10. The website's critical consensus reads, "With a talented cast turned loose on a loaded premise — and a sharp script loaded with dark comedy and unexpected twists — Game Night might be more fun than the real thing." On Metacritic, the film has a weighted average score of 66 out of 100, based on 41 critics, indicating "generally favorable" reviews. Audiences polled by CinemaScore gave the film an average grade of "B+" on an A+ to F scale, while PostTrak reported that 78% of filmgoers gave it a positive score. Many critics noted the similarity of the plot to that of The Man Who Knew Too Little.

Owen Gleiberman of Variety, gave the film a positive review, saying "Even at 100 minutes, Game Night pushes its premise to the wall of synthetic escapism. Yet the movie manipulates its audience in cunning and puckish ways. It's no big whoop, but you're happy to have been played."

Richard Lawson of Vanity Fair gave the film a positive review, but wrote: "It's a good time, but it maybe could have been a great one. Which I suppose is true of so many nights meant to deliver us from the doldrums of settled life." Jon Frosch of The Hollywood Reporter wrote: "There are chuckles here and there, but a striking absence of belly laughs".

=== Accolades ===
Award	Date of ceremony	Category	Recipients	Result	Ref.
Detroit Film Critics Society	December 3, 2018	Best Supporting Actor	Jesse Plemons	Nominated	
San Diego Film Critics Society	December 10, 2018	Best Comedic Performance	Jason Bateman	Nominated	
San Diego Film Critics Society	December 10, 2018	Best Comedic Performance	Jesse Plemons	Nominated	
San Diego Film Critics Society	December 10, 2018	Best Editing	Dave Egan and Jamie Gross	Won	
San Diego Film Critics Society	December 10, 2018	Best Ensemble	Cast	Won	
Critics' Choice Movie Awards	January 13, 2019	Best Comedy	Game Night	Nominated	
Critics' Choice Movie Awards	January 13, 2019	Best Actor in a Comedy	Jason Bateman	Nominated	
Critics' Choice Movie Awards	January 13, 2019	Best Actress in a Comedy	Rachel McAdams	Nominated	

== Future ==
During the film's opening weekend in February 2018, screenwriter Mark Perez discussed the possibility of a sequel, saying "It would be great to have sequels. Super titles like Game Night or specific titles like that feel genetically built to have sequels... That would mean the movie did well, and that's all I really care about at this stage."

In a March 2023 interview with directors Daley and Goldstein, when asked about a Game Night sequel, they said "Our favorite thing is to leave the audience wanting more, as opposed to hitting them over the head. And that was a case where we ended the movie with a sort of fake setup for a sequel, but we feel like it might be hard to top what we did."

In January 2024, Lamorne Morris said that Daley and Goldstein gave him "a straight-up no" to doing a sequel. He still pointed out that all the cast members are still acting and some might love to make it happen someday.
