= 24th Critics' Choice Awards =

2019 US film and television awards

- Date: January 13, 2019
- Site: Barker Hangar, Santa Monica, California, United States
- Hosted by: Taye Diggs

Highlights
- Most awards: Film: Roma (4); Television: The Americans / The Marvelous Mrs. Maisel (3)
- Most nominations: Film: The Favourite (14); Television: The Americans / The Assassination of Gianni Versace: American Crime Story / Escape at Dannemora (5)
- Best Picture: Roma
- Best Comedy Series: The Marvelous Mrs. Maisel
- Best Drama Series: The Americans
- Best Limited Series: The Assassination of Gianni Versace: American Crime Story
- Best Movie Made for Television: Jesus Christ Superstar Live in Concert
- Website: www.criticschoice.com

Television/radio coverage
- Network: The CW

The 24th Critics' Choice Awards were presented on January 13, 2019, at the Barker Hangar at the Santa Monica Airport, honoring the finest achievements of filmmaking and television programming in 2018. The ceremony was broadcast on The CW and hosted by Taye Diggs. The nominations were announced on December 10, 2018. HBO and Netflix co-led with 20 nominations, followed by FX with 16.

== Winners and nominees ==
=== Film ===
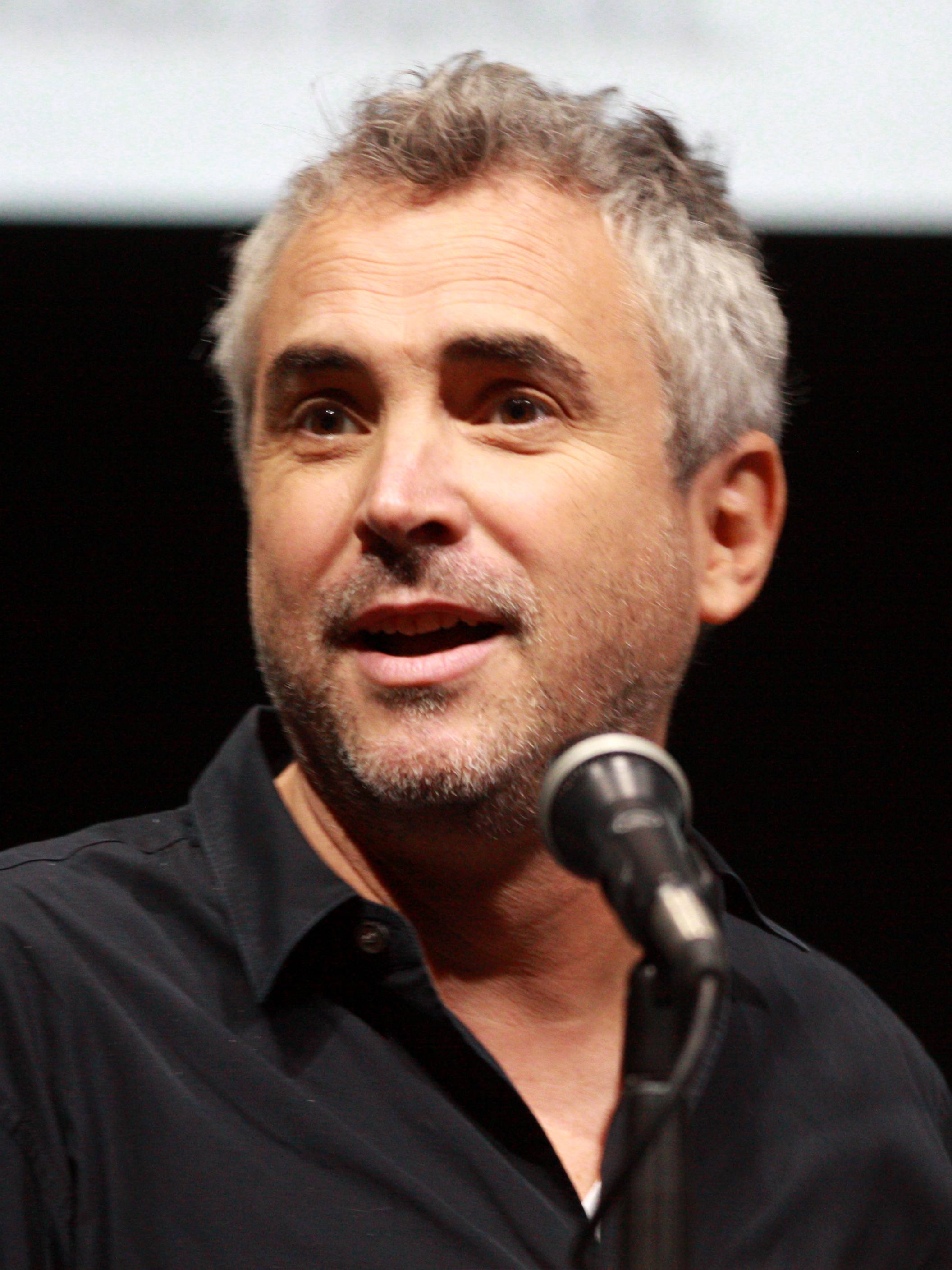
Alfonso Cuarón, Best Director And Best Cinematography winner

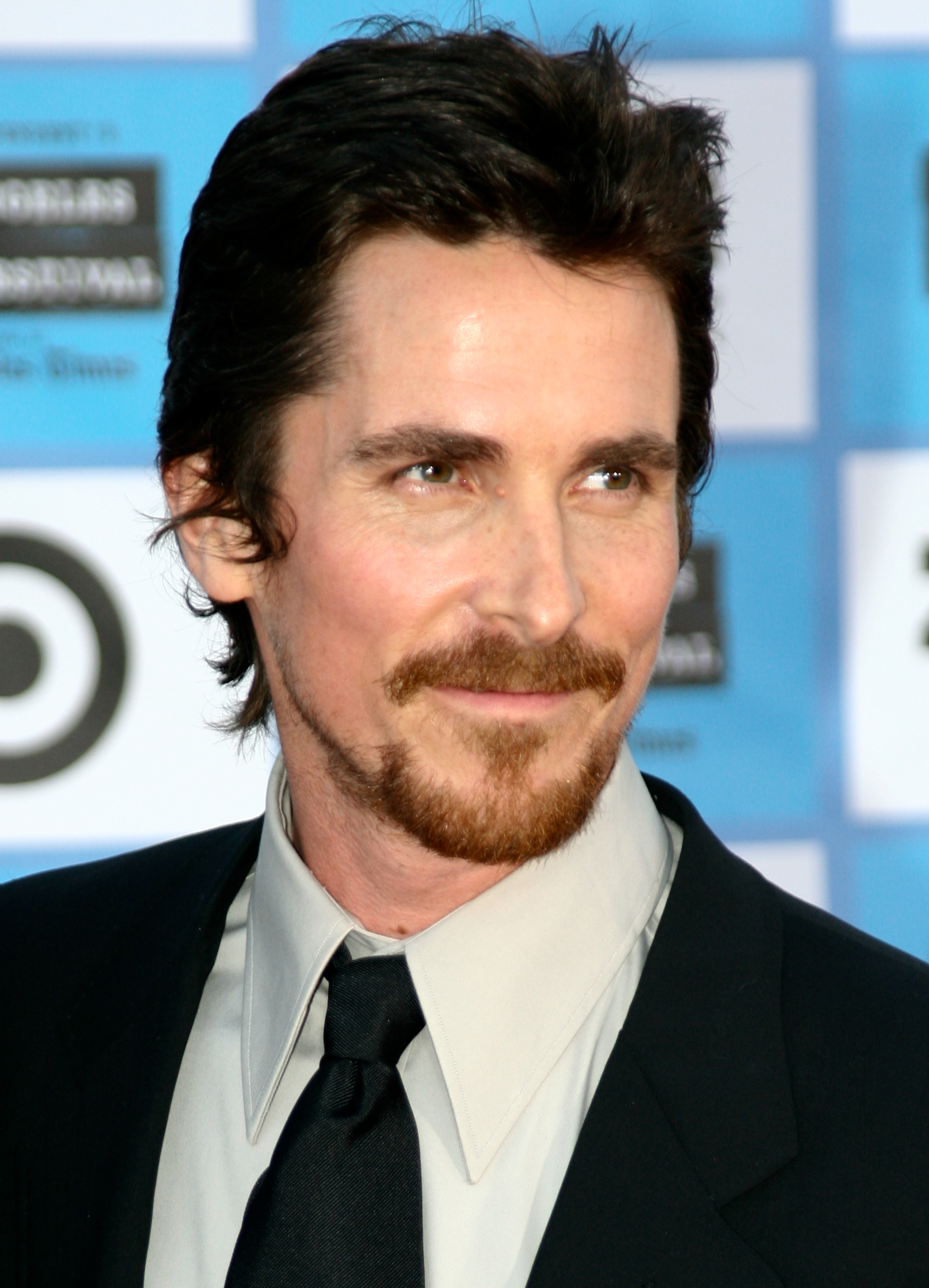
Christian Bale, Best Actor and Best Actor in a Comedy Movie winner

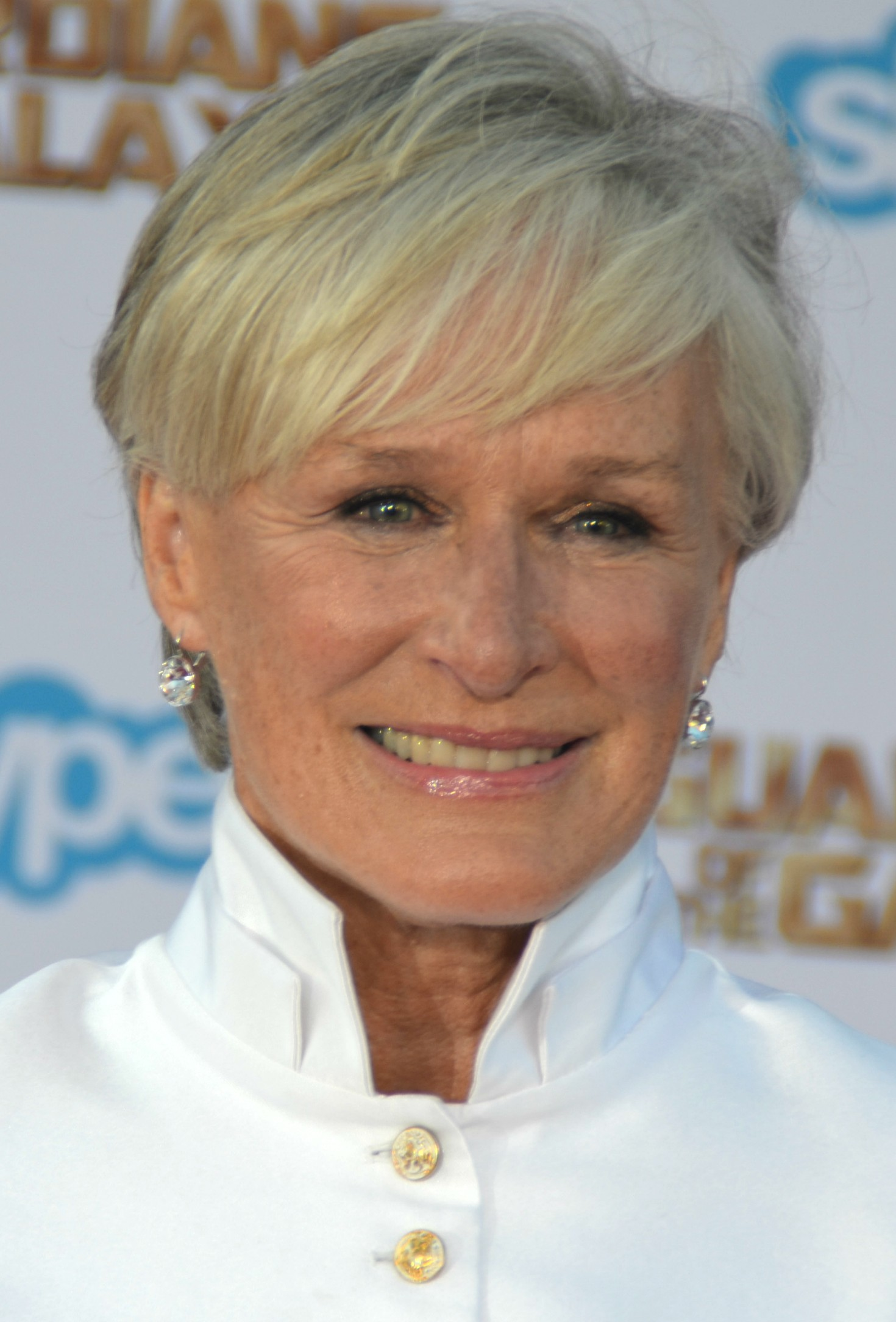
Glenn Close, Best Actress co-winner

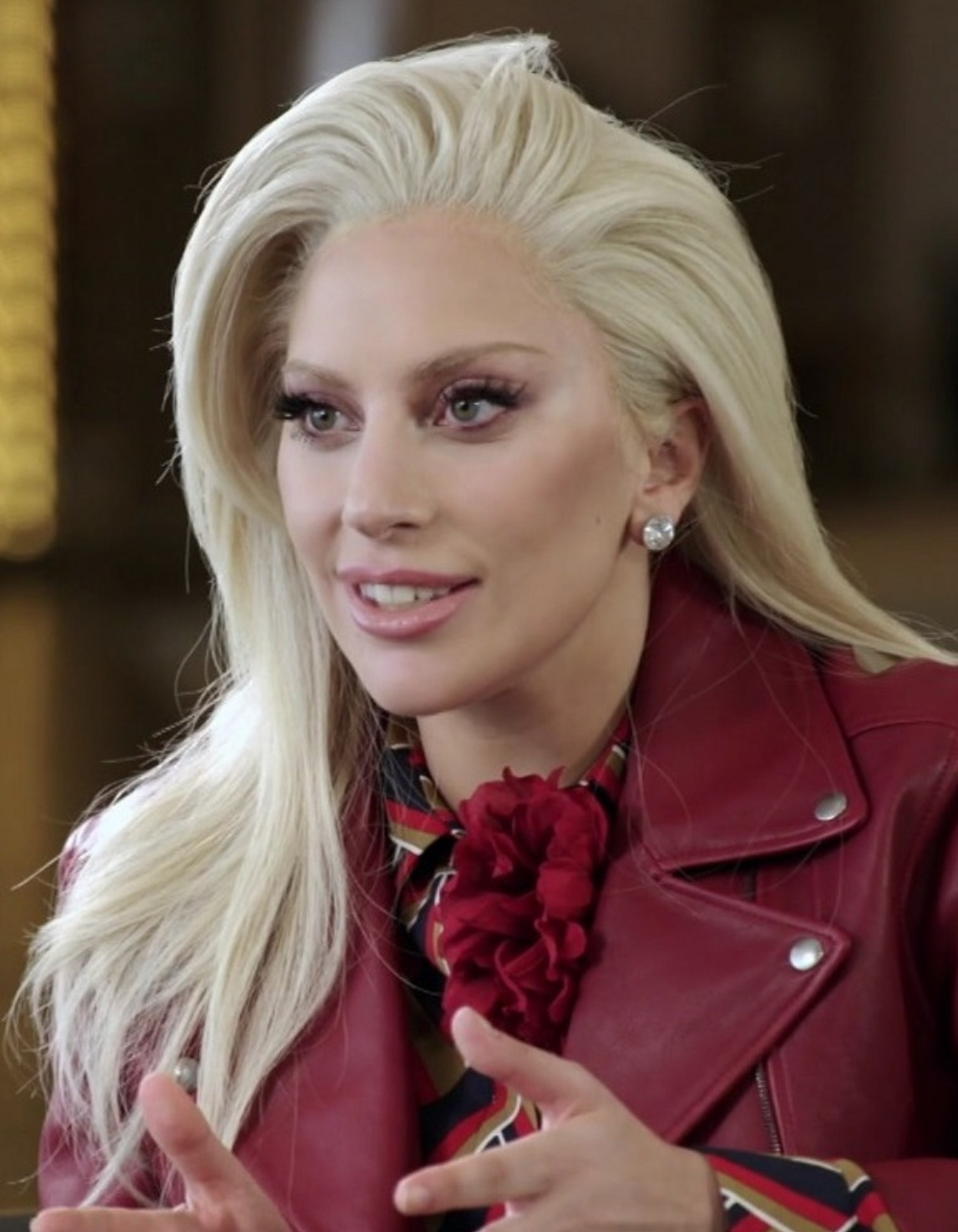
Lady Gaga, Best Actress co-winner

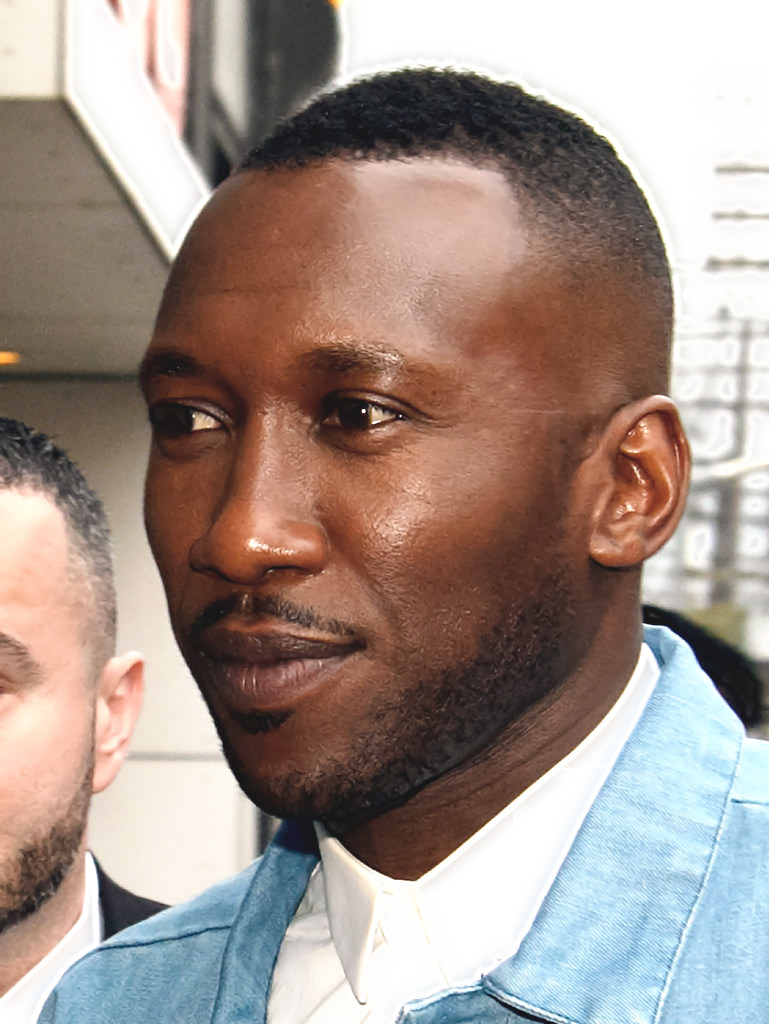
Mahershala Ali, Best Supporting Actor winner

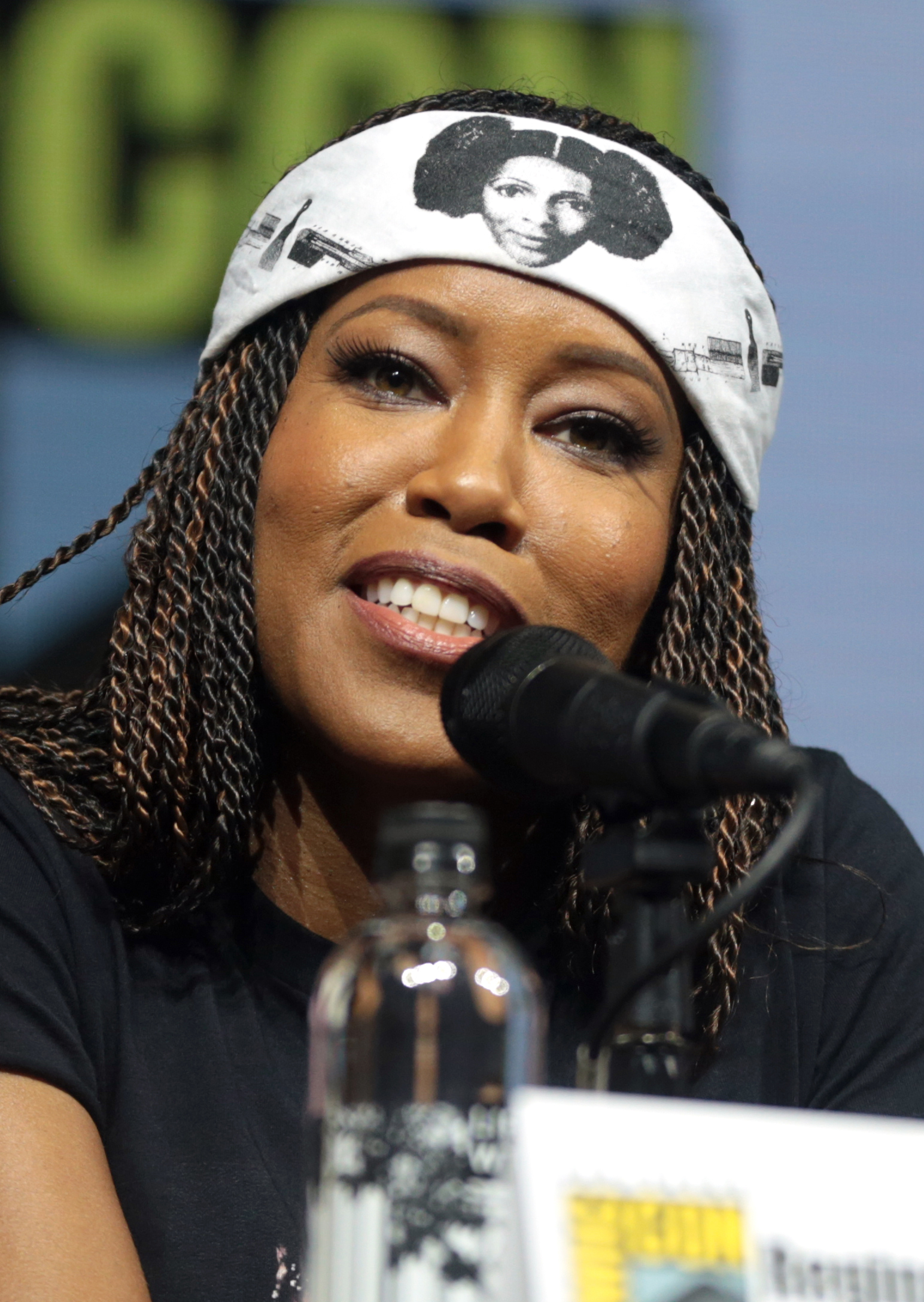
Regina King, Best Supporting Actress winner

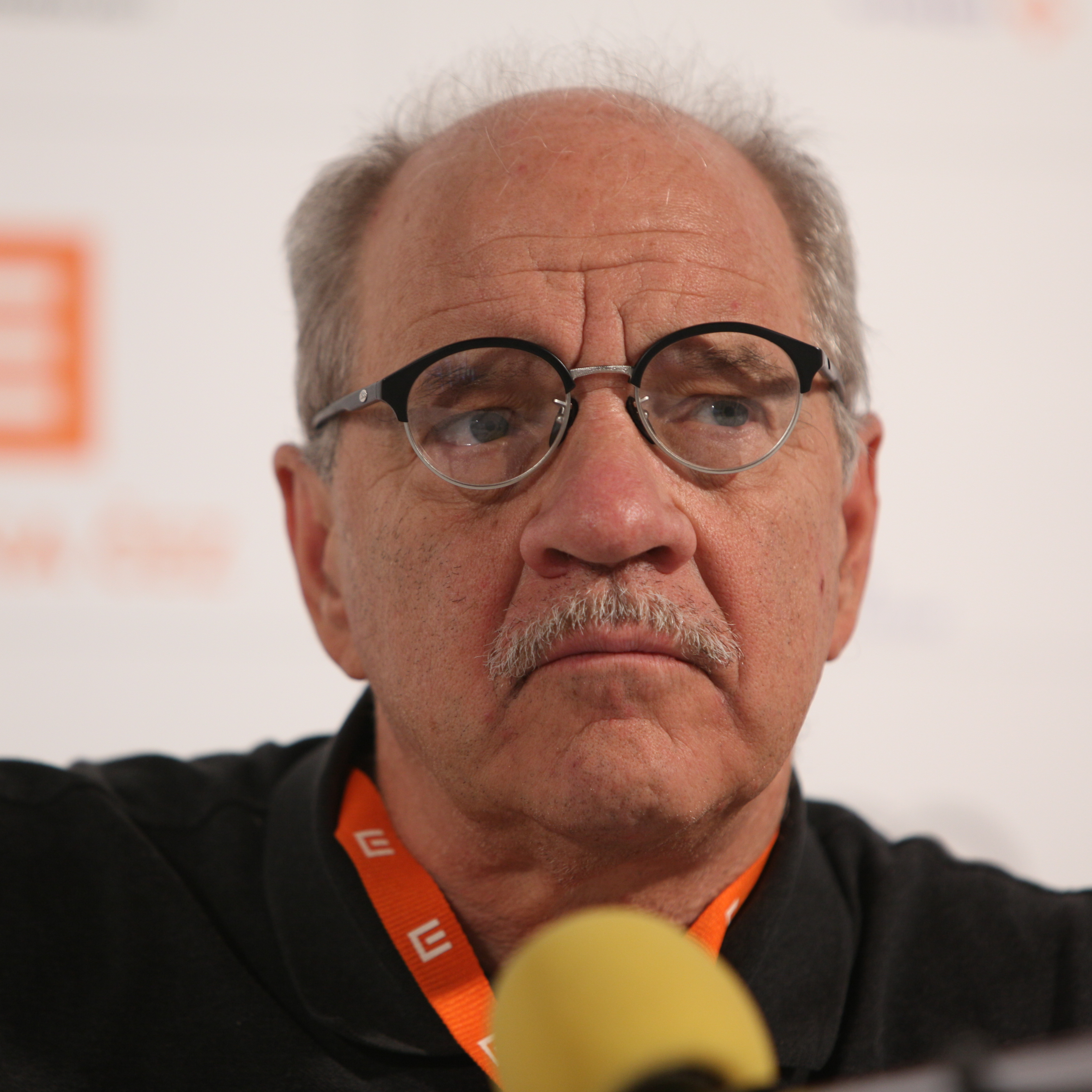
Paul Schrader, Best Original Screenplay winner

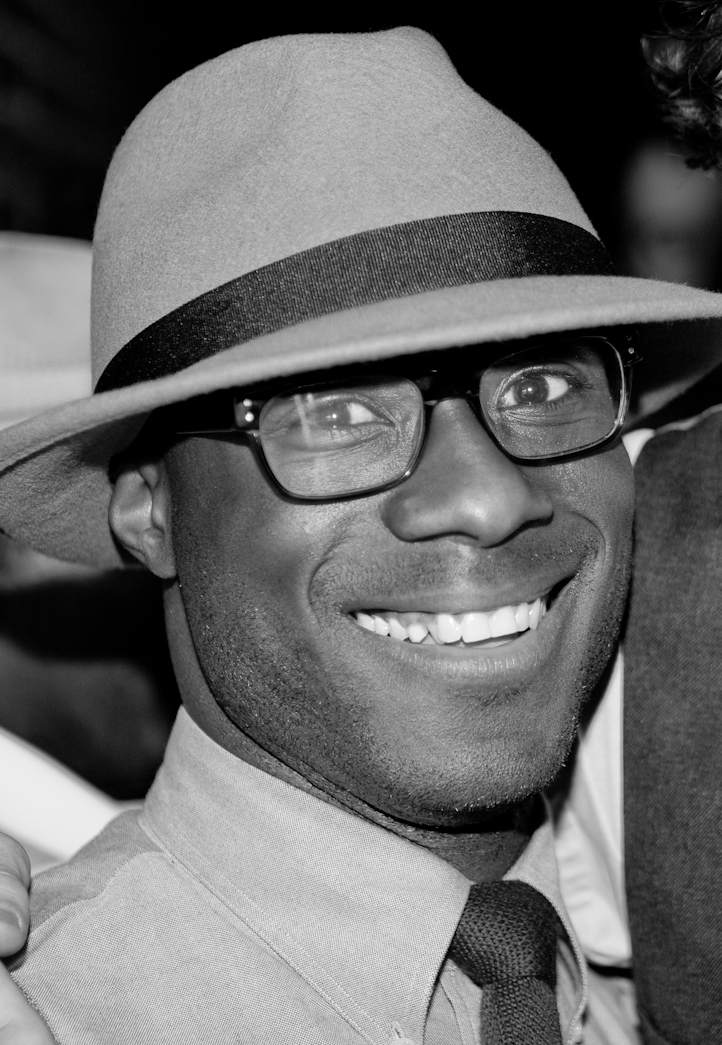
Barry Jenkins, Best Adapted Screenplay winner

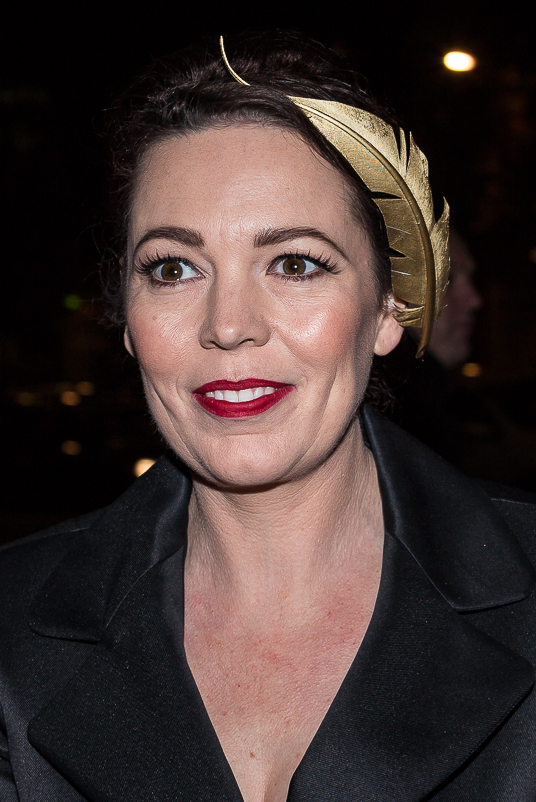
Olivia Colman, Best Actress in a Comedy Movie winner

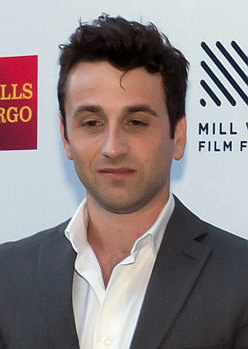
Justin Hurwitz, Best Score winner

Best Picture: Roma; Black Panther; BlacKkKlansman; The Favourite; First Man; Green Book; If Beale Street Could Talk; Mary Poppins Returns; A Star Is Born; Vice	Best Director: Alfonso Cuarón – Roma; Damien Chazelle – First Man; Bradley Cooper – A Star Is Born; Peter Farrelly – Green Book; Yorgos Lanthimos – The Favourite; Spike Lee – BlacKkKlansman; Adam McKay – Vice
Best Actor: Christian Bale – Vice as Dick Cheney; Bradley Cooper – A Star Is Born as Jackson Maine; Willem Dafoe – At Eternity's Gate as Vincent van Gogh; Ryan Gosling – First Man as Neil Armstrong; Ethan Hawke – First Reformed as Reverend Ernst Toller; Rami Malek – Bohemian Rhapsody as Freddie Mercury; Viggo Mortensen – Green Book as Frank "Tony Lip" Vallelonga	Best Actress: Glenn Close – The Wife as Joan Castleman (TIE); Lady Gaga – A Star Is Born as Ally Maine (TIE); Yalitza Aparicio – Roma as Cleodegaria "Cleo" Gutiérrez; Emily Blunt – Mary Poppins Returns as Mary Poppins; Toni Collette – Hereditary as Annie Graham; Olivia Colman – The Favourite as Queen Anne; Melissa McCarthy – Can You Ever Forgive Me? as Lee Israel
Best Supporting Actor: Mahershala Ali – Green Book as Don Shirley; Timothée Chalamet – Beautiful Boy as Nic Sheff; Adam Driver – BlacKkKlansman as Flip Zimmerman; Sam Elliott – A Star Is Born as Bobby Maine; Richard E. Grant – Can You Ever Forgive Me? as Jack Hock; Michael B. Jordan – Black Panther as N'Jadaka / Erik "Killmonger" Stevens	Best Supporting Actress: Regina King – If Beale Street Could Talk as Sharon Rivers; Amy Adams – Vice as Lynne Cheney; Claire Foy – First Man as Janet Shearon Armstrong; Nicole Kidman – Boy Erased as Nancy Eamons; Emma Stone – The Favourite as Abigail Hill; Rachel Weisz – The Favourite as Sarah Churchill
Best Young Actor/Actress: Elsie Fisher – Eighth Grade as Kayla Day; Thomasin McKenzie – Leave No Trace as Tom; Ed Oxenbould – Wildlife as Joe Brinson; Millicent Simmonds – A Quiet Place as Regan Abbott; Amandla Stenberg – The Hate U Give as Starr Carter; Sunny Suljic – Mid90s as Stevie	Best Acting Ensemble: The Favourite; Black Panther; Crazy Rich Asians; Vice; Widows
Best Original Screenplay: Paul Schrader – First Reformed; Bo Burnham – Eighth Grade; Alfonso Cuarón – Roma; Deborah Davis and Tony McNamara – The Favourite; Adam McKay – Vice; Nick Vallelonga, Brian Hayes Currie, and Peter Farrelly – Green Book; Bryan Woods, Scott Beck, and John Krasinski – A Quiet Place	Best Adapted Screenplay: Barry Jenkins – If Beale Street Could Talk; Ryan Coogler and Joe Robert Cole – Black Panther; Nicole Holofcener and Jeff Whitty – Can You Ever Forgive Me?; Eric Roth, Bradley Cooper, and Will Fetters – A Star Is Born; Josh Singer – First Man; Charlie Wachtel, David Rabinowitz, Kevin Willmott, and Spike Lee – BlacKkKlansman
Best Cinematography: Alfonso Cuarón – Roma; James Laxton – If Beale Street Could Talk; Matthew Libatique – A Star Is Born; Rachel Morrison – Black Panther; Robbie Ryan – The Favourite; Linus Sandgren – First Man	Best Production Design: Hannah Beachler and Jay Hart – Black Panther; Eugenio Caballero and Barbara Enriquez – Roma; Nelson Coates and Andrew Baseman – Crazy Rich Asians; Fiona Crombie and Alice Felton – The Favourite; Nathan Crowley and Kathy Lucas – First Man; John Myhre and Gordon Sim – Mary Poppins Returns
Best Editing: Tom Cross – First Man; Jay Cassidy – A Star Is Born; Hank Corwin – Vice; Alfonso Cuarón and Adam Gough – Roma; Yorgos Mavropsaridis – The Favourite; Joe Walker – Widows	Best Costume Design: Ruth E. Carter – Black Panther; Alexandra Byrne – Mary Queen of Scots; Julian Day – Bohemian Rhapsody; Sandy Powell – The Favourite; Sandy Powell – Mary Poppins Returns
Best Hair and Makeup: Vice; Black Panther; Bohemian Rhapsody; The Favourite; Mary Queen of Scots; Suspiria	Best Visual Effects: Black Panther; Avengers: Infinity War; First Man; Mary Poppins Returns; Mission: Impossible – Fallout; Ready Player One
Best Animated Feature: Spider-Man: Into the Spider-Verse; The Grinch; Incredibles 2; Isle of Dogs; Mirai; Ralph Breaks the Internet	Best Action Movie: Mission: Impossible – Fallout; Avengers: Infinity War; Black Panther; Deadpool 2; Ready Player One; Widows
Best Sci-Fi/Horror Movie: A Quiet Place; Annihilation; Halloween; Hereditary; Suspiria
Best Comedy: Crazy Rich Asians; Deadpool 2; The Death of Stalin; The Favourite; Game Night; Sorry to Bother You
Best Actor in a Comedy: Christian Bale – Vice as Dick Cheney; Jason Bateman – Game Night as Max Davis; Viggo Mortensen – Green Book as Frank "Tony Lip" Vallelonga; John C. Reilly – Stan & Ollie as Oliver "Ollie" Hardy; Ryan Reynolds – Deadpool 2 as Wade Wilson / Deadpool; Lakeith Stanfield – Sorry to Bother You as Cassius "Cash" Green	Best Actress in a Comedy: Olivia Colman – The Favourite as Queen Anne; Emily Blunt – Mary Poppins Returns as Mary Poppins; Elsie Fisher – Eighth Grade as Kayla Day; Rachel McAdams – Game Night as Annie Davis; Charlize Theron – Tully as Marlo Moreau; Constance Wu – Crazy Rich Asians as Rachel Chu
Best Score: Justin Hurwitz – First Man; Kris Bowers – Green Book; Nicholas Britell – If Beale Street Could Talk; Alexandre Desplat – Isle of Dogs; Ludwig Göransson – Black Panther; Marc Shaiman – Mary Poppins Returns	Best Song: "Shallow" – A Star Is Born; "All the Stars" – Black Panther; "Girl in the Movies" – Dumplin'; "I'll Fight" – RBG; "The Place Where Lost Things Go" – Mary Poppins Returns; "Trip a Little Light Fantastic" – Mary Poppins Returns
Best Foreign Language Film: Roma • Mexico; Burning • South Korea; Capernaum • Lebanon; Cold War • Poland; Shoplifters • Japan

==== #SeeHer Award ====
Claire Foy

=== Television ===
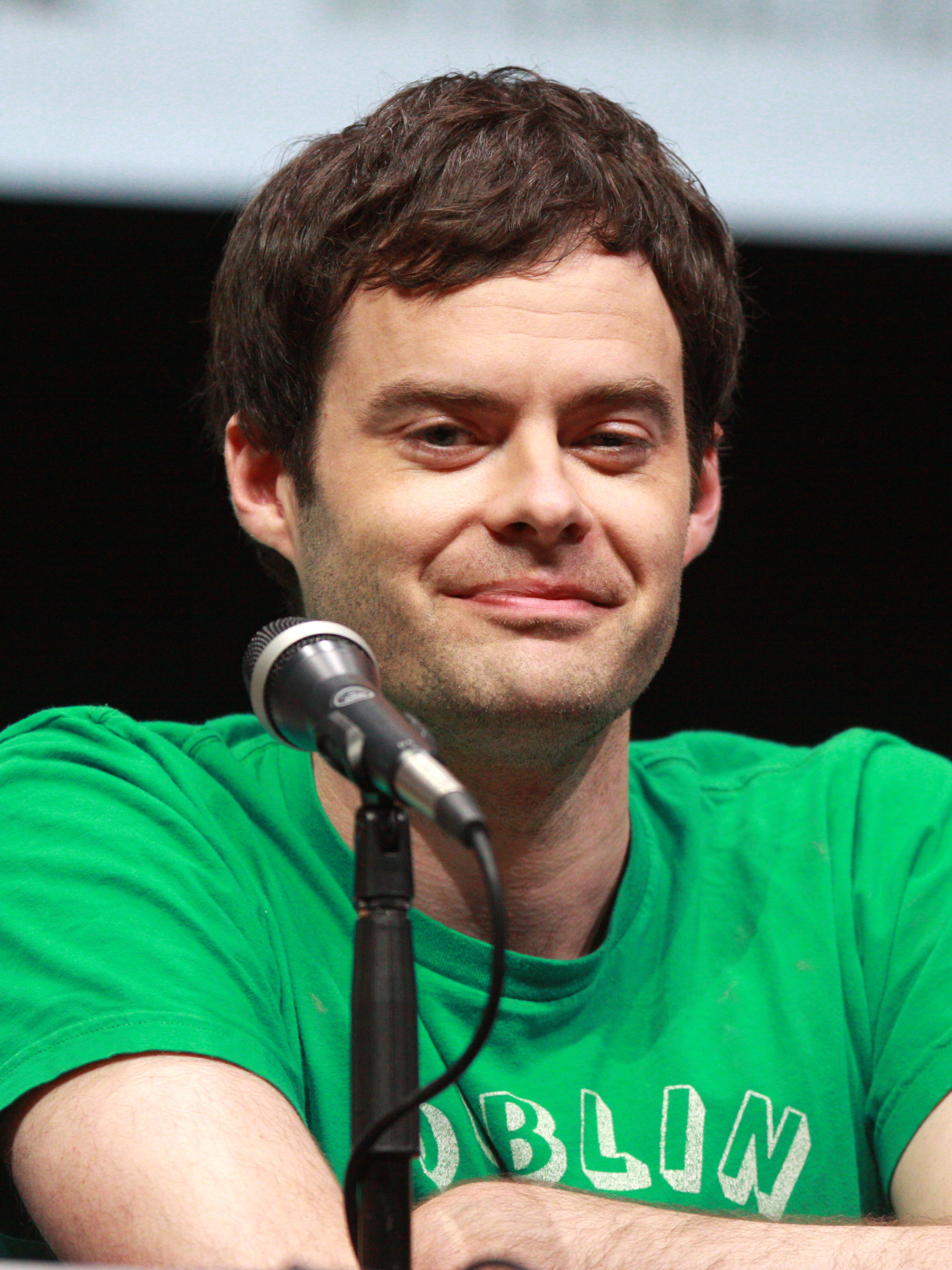
Bill Hader, Best Actor in a Comedy Series winner

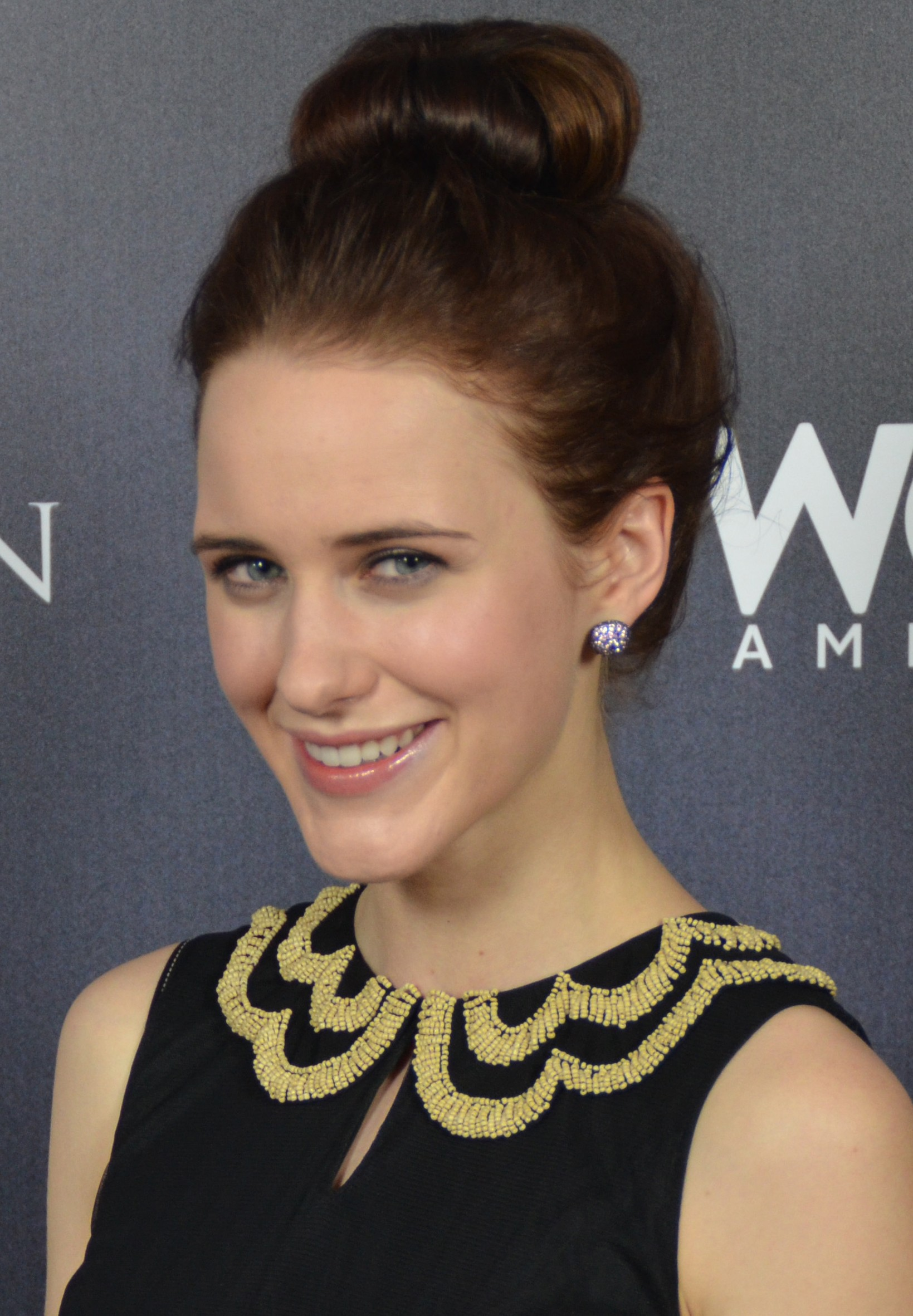
Rachel Brosnahan, Best Actress in a Comedy Series winner

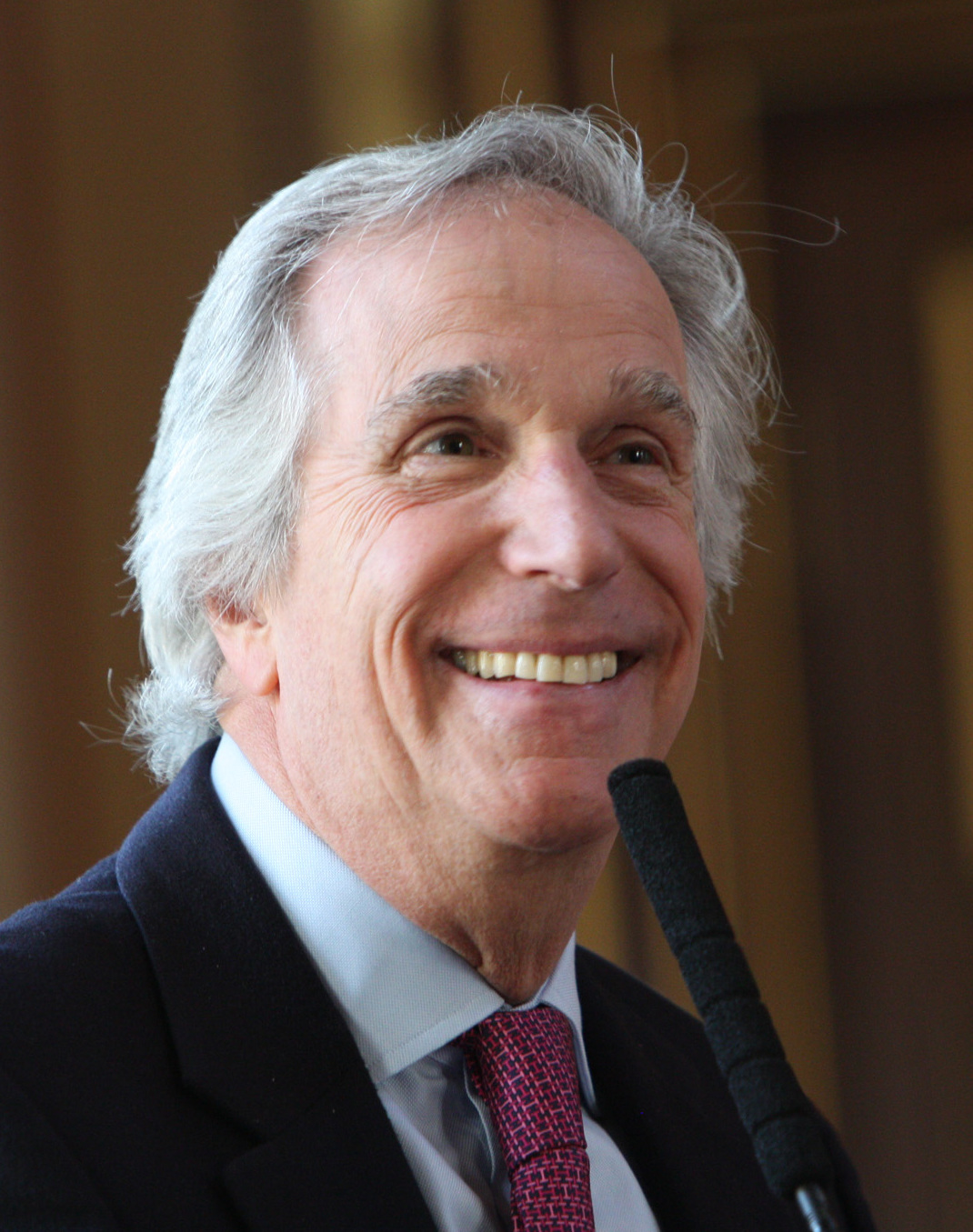
Henry Winkler, Best Supporting Actor in a Comedy Series winner

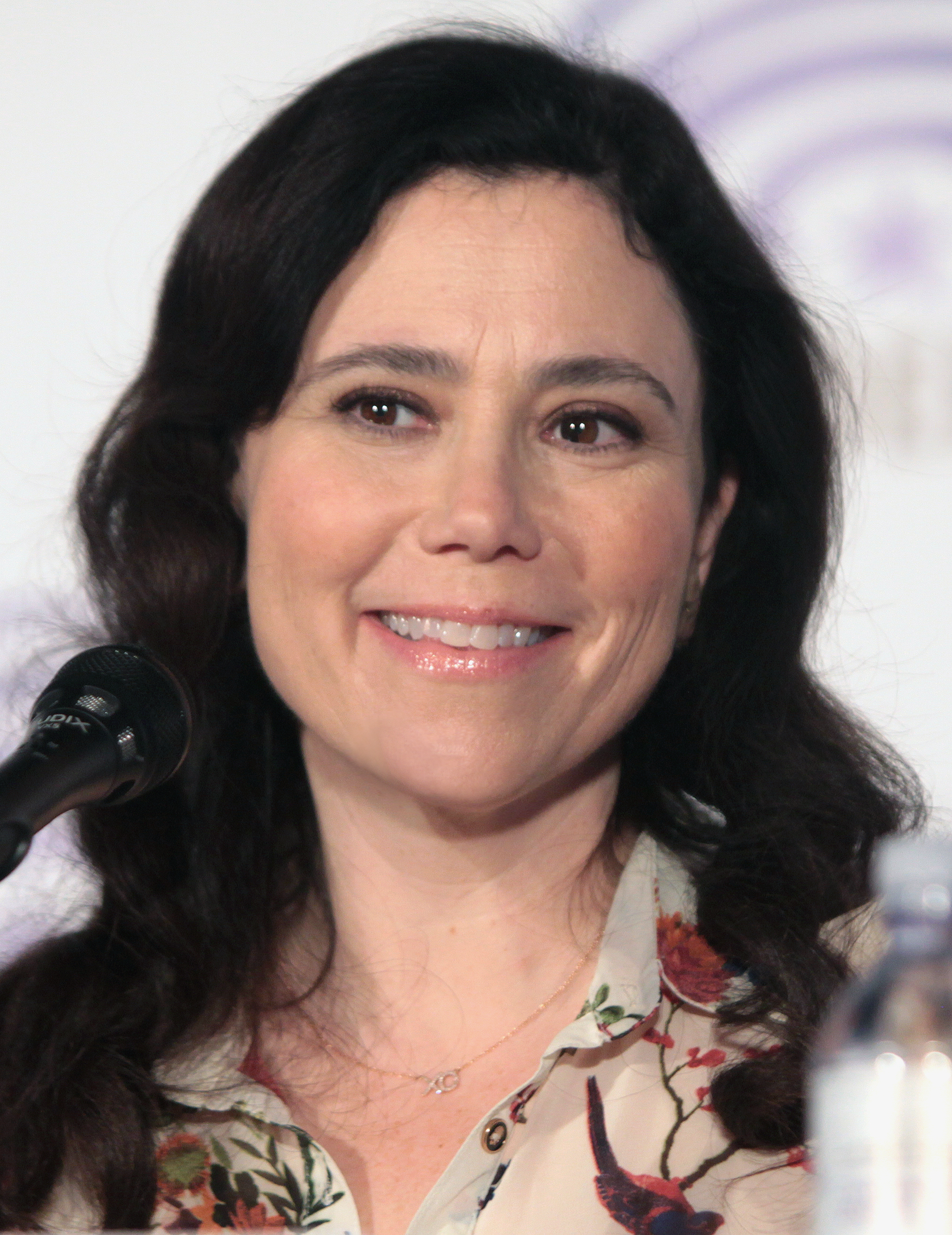
Alex Borstein, Best Supporting Actress in a Comedy Series winner

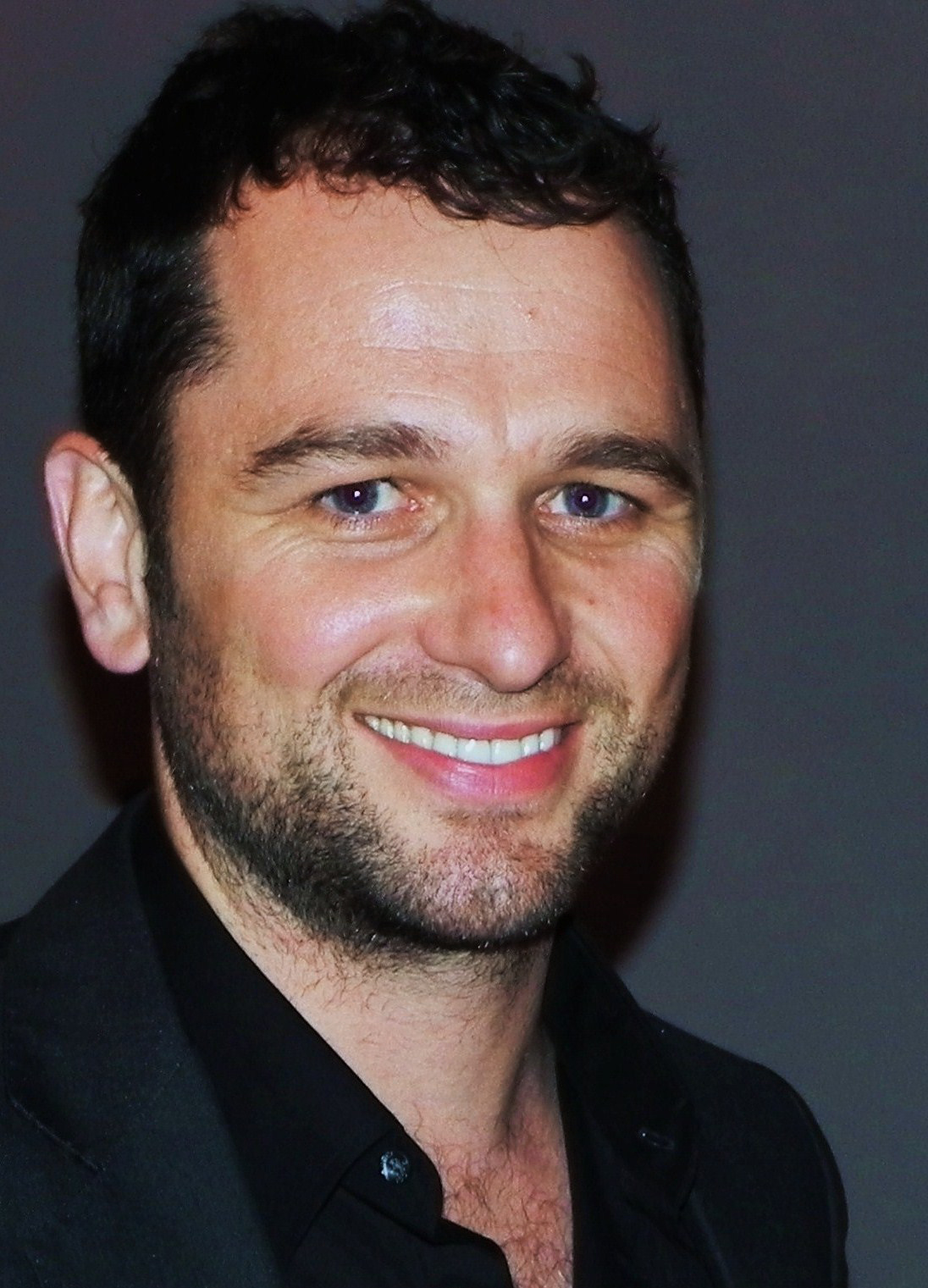
Matthew Rhys, Best Actor in a Drama Series winner

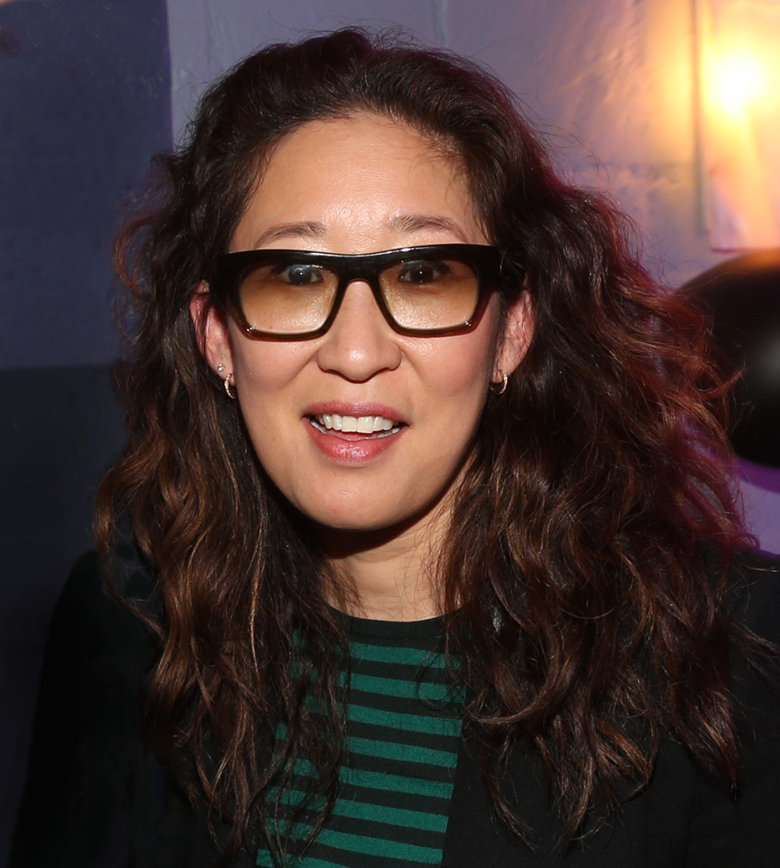
Sandra Oh, Best Actress in a Drama Series winner

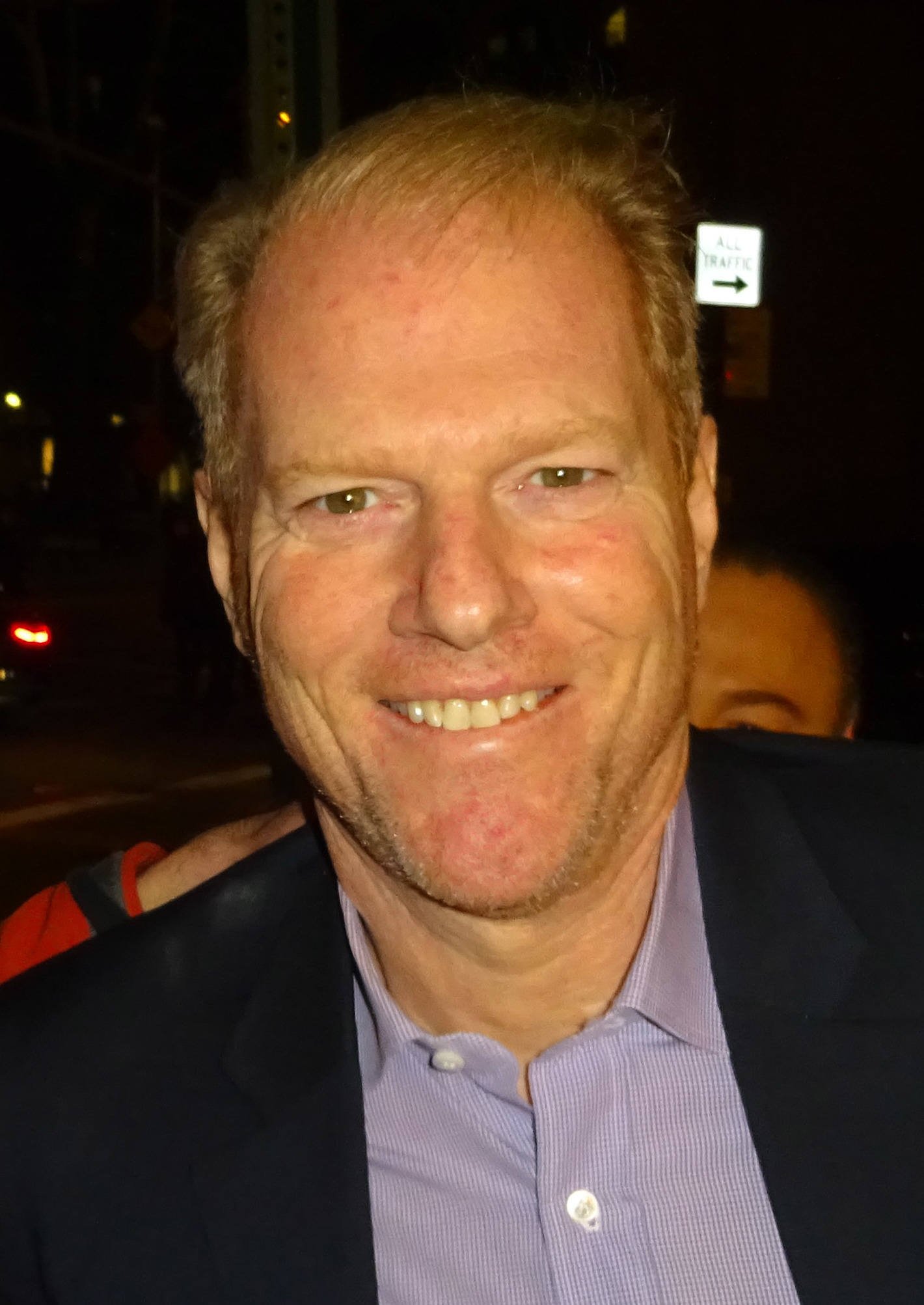
Noah Emmerich, Best Supporting Actor in a Drama Series winner

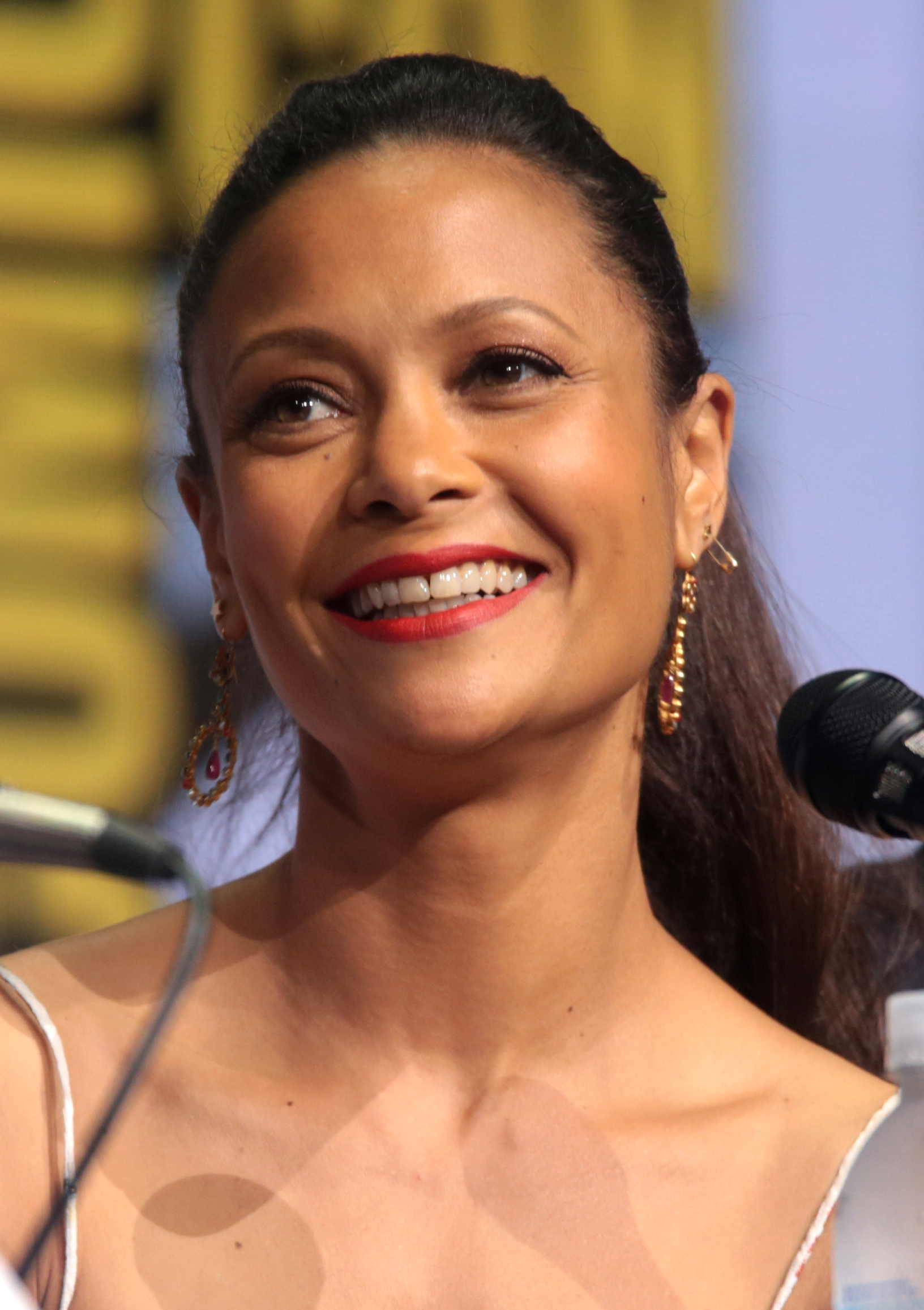
Thandiwe Newton, Best Supporting Actress in a Drama Series winner

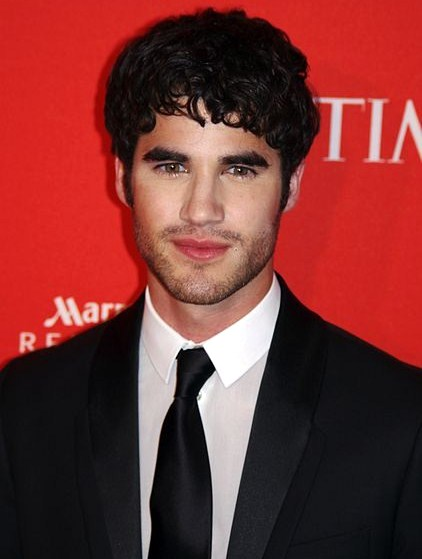
Darren Criss, Best Actor in a Movie/Limited Series winner

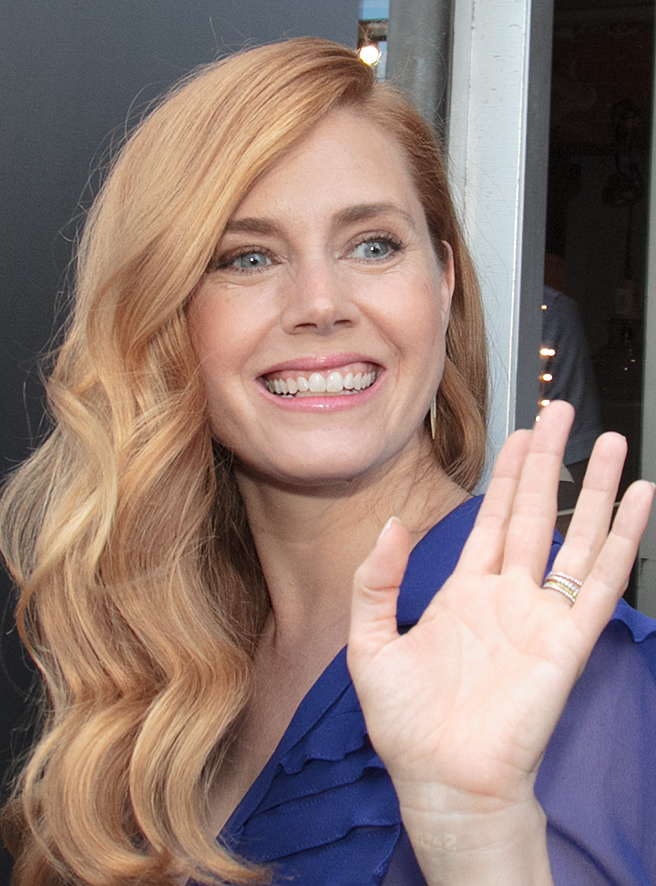
Amy Adams, Best Actress in a Movie/Limited Series co-winner

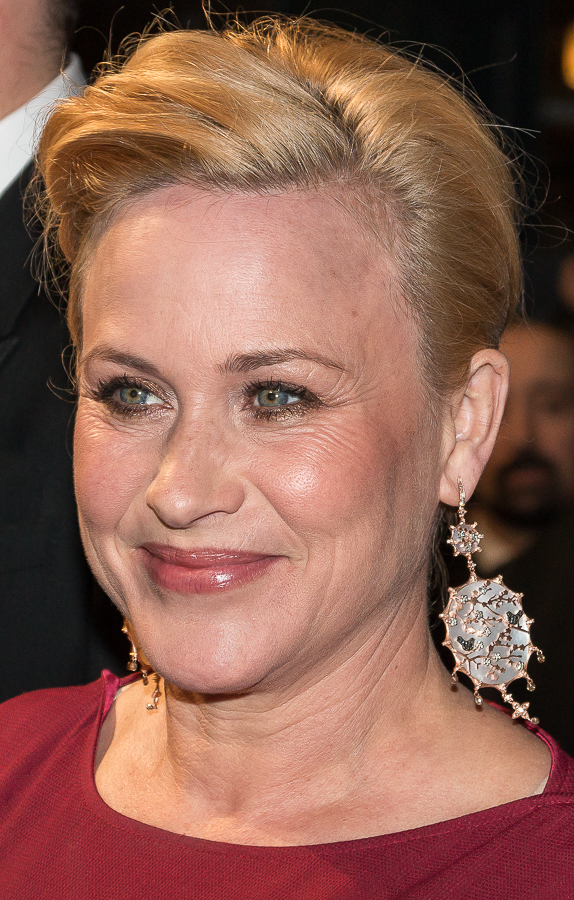
Patricia Arquette, Best Actress in a Movie/Limited Series co-winner

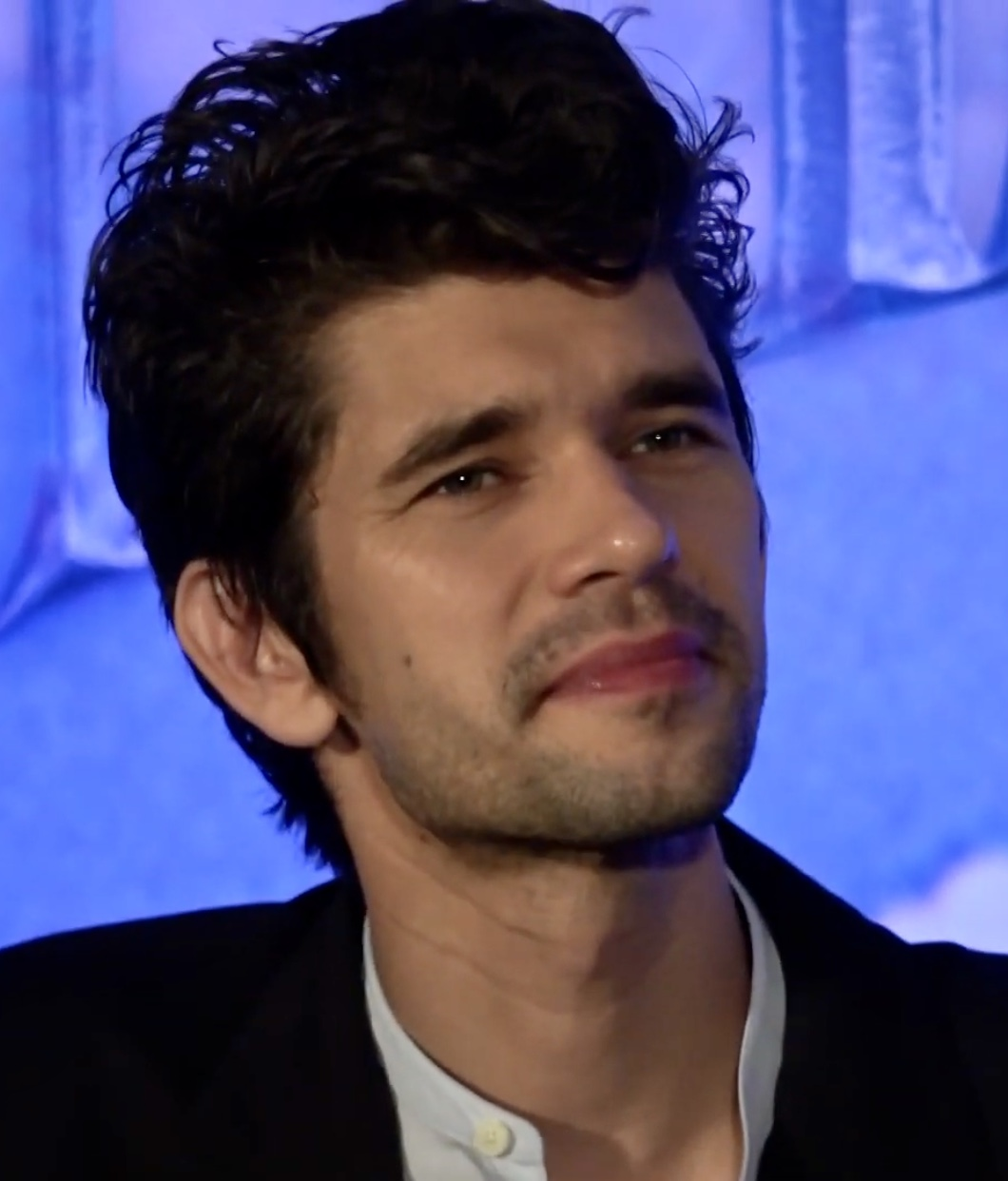
Ben Whishaw, Best Supporting Actor in a Movie/Limited Series winner

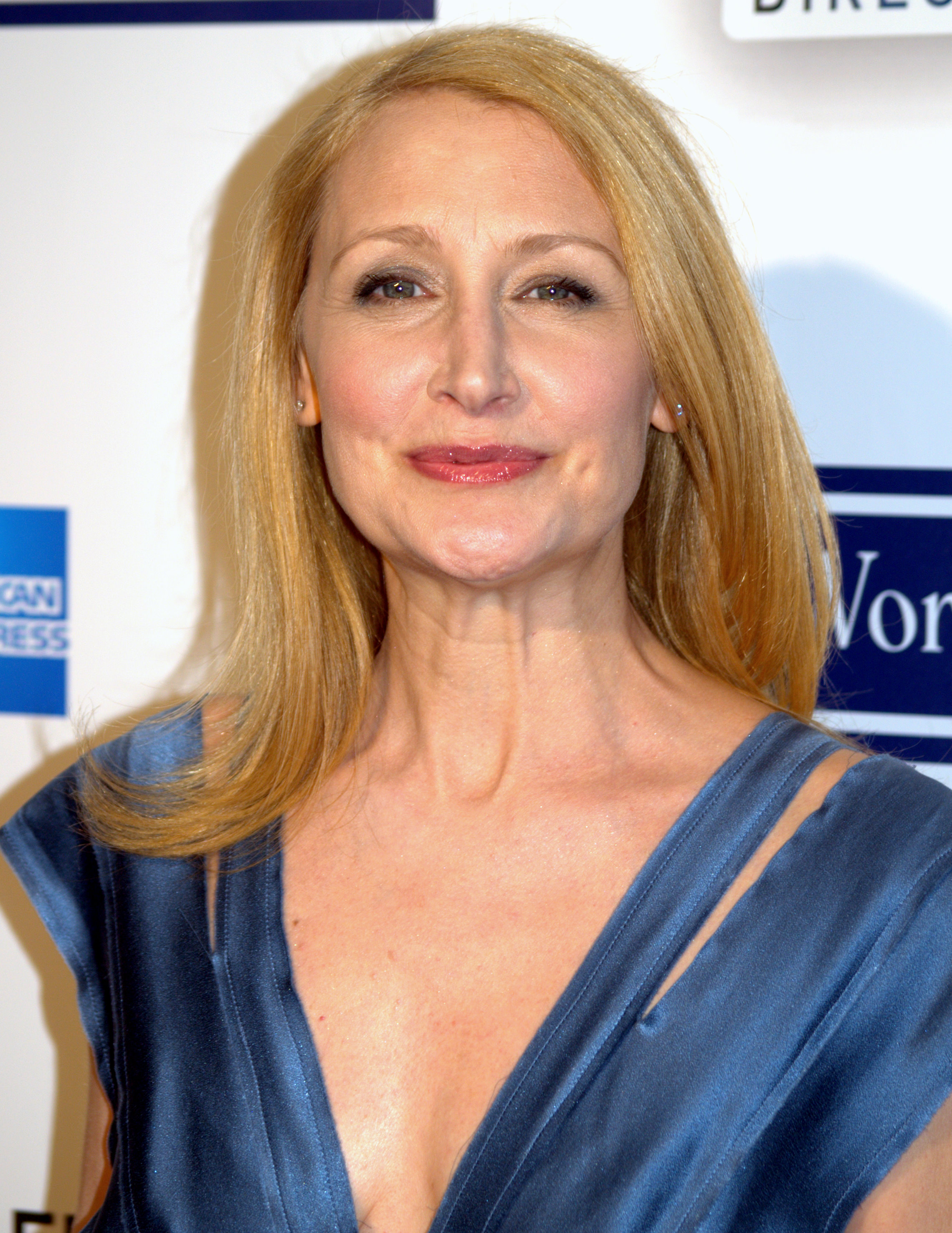
Patricia Clarkson, Best Supporting Actress in a Movie/Limited Series winner

Best Series
Best Comedy Series	Best Drama Series
The Marvelous Mrs. Maisel (Amazon); Atlanta (FX); Barry (HBO); The Good Place (NBC); The Kominsky Method (Netflix); The Middle (ABC); One Day at a Time (Netflix); Schitt's Creek (Pop)	The Americans (FX); Better Call Saul (AMC); The Good Fight (CBS All Access); Homecoming (Amazon); Killing Eve (BBC America); My Brilliant Friend (HBO); Pose (FX); Succession (HBO)
Best Limited Series	Best TV Movie
The Assassination of Gianni Versace: American Crime Story (FX); American Vandal (Netflix); Escape at Dannemora (Showtime); Genius: Picasso (Nat Geo); Sharp Objects (HBO); A Very English Scandal (Amazon)	Jesus Christ Superstar Live in Concert (NBC); Icebox (HBO); King Lear (Amazon); My Dinner with Hervé (HBO); Notes from the Field (HBO); The Tale (HBO)
Best Animated Series
BoJack Horseman (Netflix); Adventure Time (Cartoon Network); Archer (FXX); Bob's Burgers (Fox); The Simpsons (Fox); South Park (Comedy Central)
Best Acting in a Comedy Series
Best Actor	Best Actress
Bill Hader – Barry as Barry Berkman / Barry Block; Hank Azaria – Brockmire as Jim Brockmire; Ted Danson – The Good Place as Michael; Michael Douglas – The Kominsky Method as Sandy Kominsky; Donald Glover – Atlanta as Earnest "Earn" Marks; Jim Parsons – The Big Bang Theory as Dr. Sheldon Cooper; Andy Samberg – Brooklyn Nine-Nine as Detective Jake Peralta	Rachel Brosnahan – The Marvelous Mrs. Maisel as Miriam "Midge" Maisel; Rachel Bloom – Crazy Ex-Girlfriend as Rebecca Bunch; Allison Janney – Mom as Bonnie Plunkett; Justina Machado – One Day at a Time as Penelope Alvarez; Debra Messing – Will & Grace as Grace Adler; Issa Rae – Insecure as Issa Dee
Best Supporting Actor	Best Supporting Actress
Henry Winkler – Barry as Gene Cousineau; William Jackson Harper – The Good Place as Chidi Anagonye; Sean Hayes – Will & Grace as Jack McFarland; Brian Tyree Henry – Atlanta as Alfred "Paper Boi" Miles; Nico Santos – Superstore as Mateo Fernando Aquino Liwanag; Tony Shalhoub – The Marvelous Mrs. Maisel as Abraham "Abe" Weissman	Alex Borstein – The Marvelous Mrs. Maisel as Susie Myerson; Betty Gilpin – GLOW as Debbie "Liberty Belle" Eagan; Laurie Metcalf – The Conners as Jackie Harris; Rita Moreno – One Day at a Time as Lydia Riera; Zoe Perry – Young Sheldon as Mary Cooper; Annie Potts – Young Sheldon as Constance "Connie" Tucker; Miriam Shor – Younger as Diana Trout
Best Acting in a Drama Series
Best Actor	Best Actress
Matthew Rhys – The Americans as Philip Jennings; Freddie Highmore – The Good Doctor as Dr. Shaun Murphy; Diego Luna – Narcos: Mexico as Miguel Ángel Félix Gallardo; Richard Madden – Bodyguard as Sergeant David Budd; Bob Odenkirk – Better Call Saul as Jimmy McGill; Billy Porter – Pose as Pray Tell; Milo Ventimiglia – This Is Us as Jack Pearson	Sandra Oh – Killing Eve as Eve Polastri; Jodie Comer – Killing Eve as Villanelle / Oksana Astankova; Maggie Gyllenhaal – The Deuce as Eileen "Candy" Merrell; Elisabeth Moss – The Handmaid's Tale as June Osborne / Offred; Elizabeth Olsen – Sorry for Your Loss as Leigh Shaw; Julia Roberts – Homecoming as Heidi Bergman; Keri Russell – The Americans as Elizabeth Jennings
Best Supporting Actor	Best Supporting Actress
Noah Emmerich – The Americans as Stan Beeman; Richard Cabral – Mayans M.C. as Johnny "El Coco" Cruz; Asia Kate Dillon – Billions as Taylor Amber Mason; Justin Hartley – This Is Us as Kevin Pearson; Matthew Macfadyen – Succession as Tom Wamsgans; Richard Schiff – The Good Doctor as Dr. Aaron Glassman; Shea Whigham – Homecoming as Thomas Carrasco	Thandiwe Newton – Westworld as Maeve Millay; Julia Garner – Ozark as Ruth Langmore; Rhea Seehorn – Better Call Saul as Kim Wexler; Dina Shihabi – Jack Ryan as Hanin Ali; Yvonne Strahovski – The Handmaid's Tale as Serena Joy Waterford; Holly Taylor – The Americans as Paige Jennings
Best Acting in a Movie/Limited Series
Best Actor	Best Actress
Darren Criss – The Assassination of Gianni Versace: American Crime Story as Andrew Cunanan; Antonio Banderas – Genius: Picasso as Pablo Picasso; Paul Dano – Escape at Dannemora as David Sweat; Benicio del Toro – Escape at Dannemora as Richard Matt; Hugh Grant – A Very English Scandal as Jeremy Thorpe; John Legend – Jesus Christ Superstar Live in Concert as Jesus Christ	Amy Adams – Sharp Objects as Camille Preaker (TIE); Patricia Arquette – Escape at Dannemora as Tilly Mitchell (TIE); Connie Britton – Dirty John as Debra Newell; Carrie Coon – The Sinner as Vera Walker; Laura Dern – The Tale as Jennifer Fox; Anna Deavere Smith – Notes from the Field as Various Characters
Best Supporting Actor	Best Supporting Actress
Ben Whishaw – A Very English Scandal as Norman Josiffe; Brandon Victor Dixon – Jesus Christ Superstar Live in Concert as Judas Iscariot; Eric Lange – Escape at Dannemora as Lyle Mitchell; Alex Rich – Genius: Picasso as Young Pablo Picasso; Peter Sarsgaard – The Looming Tower as Martin Schmidt; Finn Wittrock – The Assassination of Gianni Versace: American Crime Story as Jeff Trail	Patricia Clarkson – Sharp Objects as Adora Crellin; Ellen Burstyn – The Tale as Nadine "Nettie" Fox; Penélope Cruz – The Assassination of Gianni Versace: American Crime Story as Donatella Versace; Julia Garner – Dirty John as Terra Newell; Judith Light – The Assassination of Gianni Versace: American Crime Story as Marilyn Miglin; Elizabeth Perkins – Sharp Objects as Jackie O'Neill

==== The Critics' Choice Creative Achievement Award ====
Chuck Lorre

== Films with multiple nominations and wins ==
The following twenty-eight films received multiple nominations:

Film	Nominations
The Favourite	14
Black Panther	12
First Man	10
Mary Poppins Returns	9
A Star Is Born	9
Vice	9
Roma	8
Green Book	7
If Beale Street Could Talk	5
BlacKkKlansman	4
Crazy Rich Asians	4
Bohemian Rhapsody	3
Can You Ever Forgive Me?	3
Deadpool 2	3
Eighth Grade	3
Game Night	3
A Quiet Place	3
Widows	3
Avengers: Infinity War	2
First Reformed	2
Hereditary	2
Isle of Dogs	2
Mary Queen of Scots	2
Mission: Impossible – Fallout	2
Ready Player One	2
Sorry to Bother You	2
Suspiria	2

The following seven films received multiple awards:

Film	Wins
Roma	4
Black Panther	3
Vice	3
The Favourite	2
First Man	2
If Beale Street Could Talk	2
A Star Is Born	2

== Television programs with multiple nominations and wins ==
The following programs received multiple nominations:

Program	Network	Category	Nominations
The Americans	FX	Drama	5
The Assassination of Gianni Versace: American Crime Story	FX	Limited	5
Escape at Dannemora	Showtime	Limited	5
The Marvelous Mrs. Maisel	Amazon Prime Video	Comedy	4
Sharp Objects	HBO	Limited	4
Atlanta	FX	Comedy	3
Barry	HBO	Comedy	3
Better Call Saul	AMC	Drama	3
Genius: Picasso	National Geographic	Limited	3
The Good Place	NBC	Comedy	3
Homecoming	Amazon Prime Video	Drama	3
Jesus Christ Superstar Live in Concert	NBC	Movie	3
Killing Eve	BBC America	Drama	3
One Day at a Time	Netflix	Comedy	3
The Tale	HBO	Movie	3
A Very English Scandal	Amazon Prime Video	Limited	3
Dirty John	Bravo	Limited	2
The Good Doctor	ABC	Drama	2
The Handmaid's Tale	Hulu	Drama	2
The Kominsky Method	Netflix	Comedy	2
Notes from the Field	HBO	Movie	2
Pose	FX	Drama	2
Succession	HBO	Drama	2
This Is Us	NBC	Drama	2
Will & Grace	NBC	Comedy	2
Young Sheldon	CBS	Comedy	2

The following programs received multiple awards:

Programs	Network	Category	Wins
The Americans	FX	Drama	3
The Marvelous Mrs. Maisel	Amazon Prime Video	Comedy	3
The Assassination of Gianni Versace: American Crime Story	FX	Limited	2
Barry	HBO	Comedy	2
Sharp Objects	HBO	Limited	2
