= Old Rondo =

Old Rondo may refer to the following places in the United States:

- Old Rondo, a historic neighborhood in Saint Paul, Minnesota
- Old Rondo Cemetery, located in Miller County, Arkansas

== See also ==
- Rondo (disambiguation)
