= Detroit Film Critics Society Award for Best Supporting Actor =

Annual US film award

The Detroit Film Critics Society Award for Best Supporting Actor is an annual award given by the Detroit Film Critics Society to honor the best supporting actor of that year.

== Winners ==
indicates the winners.

- † indicates the winner of the Academy Award for Best Supporting Actor.

=== 2000s ===
Year	Actor	Film
2007	Javier Bardem †	No Country for Old Men
2007	Casey Affleck	The Assassination of Jesse James by the Coward Robert Ford
2007	Paul Dano	There Will Be Blood
2007	Hal Holbrook	Into the Wild
2007	Tom Wilkinson	Michael Clayton
2008	Heath Ledger †	The Dark Knight
2008	Robert Downey Jr.	Tropic Thunder
2008	James Franco	Pineapple Express
2008	Eddie Marsan	Happy-Go-Lucky
2008	Michael Shannon	Revolutionary Road
2009	Christoph Waltz †	Inglourious Basterds
2009	Woody Harrelson	The Messenger
2009	Woody Harrelson	Zombieland
2009	Christian McKay	Me and Orson Welles
2009	Stanley Tucci	The Lovely Bones

=== 2010s ===
Year	Actor	Film
2010	Christian Bale †	The Fighter
2010	Andrew Garfield	The Social Network
2010	John Hawkes	Winter's Bone
2010	Sam Rockwell	Conviction
2010	Mark Ruffalo	The Kids Are All Right
2010	Geoffrey Rush	The King's Speech
2011	Christopher Plummer †	Beginners
2011	Kenneth Branagh	My Week with Marilyn
2011	Albert Brooks	Drive
2011	Ryan Gosling	Crazy, Stupid, Love
2011	Patton Oswalt	Young Adult
2012	Robert De Niro	Silver Linings Playbook
2012	Philip Seymour Hoffman	The Master
2012	Tommy Lee Jones	Lincoln
2012	Matthew McConaughey	Magic Mike
2012	Ewan McGregor	The Impossible
2012	Ezra Miller	The Perks of Being a Wallflower
2013	Jared Leto †	Dallas Buyers Club
2013	Barkhad Abdi	Captain Phillips
2013	James Franco	Spring Breakers
2013	Matthew McConaughey	Mud
2013	Stanley Tucci	The Hunger Games: Catching Fire
2014	J. K. Simmons †	Whiplash
2014	Josh Brolin	Inherent Vice
2014	Ethan Hawke	Boyhood
2014	Edward Norton	Birdman or (The Unexpected Virtue of Ignorance)
2014	Mark Ruffalo	Foxcatcher
2015	Liev Schreiber	Spotlight
2015	Paul Dano	Love & Mercy
2015	Benicio Del Toro	Sicario
2015	Oscar Isaac	Ex Machina
2015	Jacob Tremblay	Room
2016	Jeff Bridges	Hell or High Water
2016	Mahershala Ali †	Moonlight
2016	Alden Ehrenreich	Hail, Caesar!
2016	Ralph Fiennes	A Bigger Splash
2016	Lucas Hedges	Manchester by the Sea
2017	Willem Dafoe	The Florida Project
2017	Richard Jenkins	The Shape of Water
2017	Sam Rockwell †	Three Billboards Outside Ebbing, Missouri
2017	Patrick Stewart	Logan
2017	Michael Stuhlbarg	Call Me by Your Name
2018	Josh Hamilton	Eighth Grade
2018	Mahershala Ali †	Green Book
2018	Sam Elliott	A Star is Born
2018	Richard E. Grant	Can You Ever Forgive Me?
2018	Jesse Plemons	Game Night
2019	Joe Pesci	The Irishman
2019	Willem Dafoe	The Lighthouse
2019	Tom Hanks	A Beautiful Day in the Neighborhood
2019	Brad Pitt †	Once Upon a Time in Hollywood
2019	Sam Rockwell	Richard Jewell
2019	Wesley Snipes	Dolemite Is My Name

=== 2020s ===
- 2020: Daniel Kaluuya, Judas and the Black Messiah
- 2021: Jon Bernthal, King Richard
