= Olivia (dog) =

American West Highland White Terrier dog actress

Olivia (born 2015) is an American West Highland White Terrier dog actress best known for her roles in films like Widows and Game Night, both released in 2018.

== Career ==
Olivia is represented by Animal Casting Atlanta.

Her first screen appearance was in Netflix's Insatiable, which premiered in 2018.

In Game Night, Olivia played a male dog named Bastian. On the set of Widows, Olivia was given her own trailer and groomers. She played a female dog also named Olivia.

She has received praise from Viola Davis for her work in Widows: "I don't own a dog in life, so I was [complaining] like, 'I've gotta work with a dog. What if the dog licks me? Dogs are nasty and disgusting.' Within the first five minutes, I'm kissing the dog, I'm holding the dog, the dog was on my chest. I love that dog, and she came to me so easily."

== See also ==
- List of individual dogs
