= Rondo (name) =

Rondo or Rondó is a given name and surname. Notable people with the name include:

== Given name ==
- Rondo Hatton (1894–1946), American actor
- Rondo Cameron (1925–2001), professor

== Surname ==
- Abelardo Gamarra Rondó (1850–1924), Peruvian writer, composer and journalist
- Don Rondo (1930–2011), American singer
- José Luis Rondo (born 1976), Equatoguinean former football defender
- Manuel Rondo (born 1967), Equatoguinean long-distance runner
- Quando Rondo (born 1999), American rapper and singer
- Rajon Rondo (born 1986), American professional basketball player
