= Rondo (game) =

Association football training drill

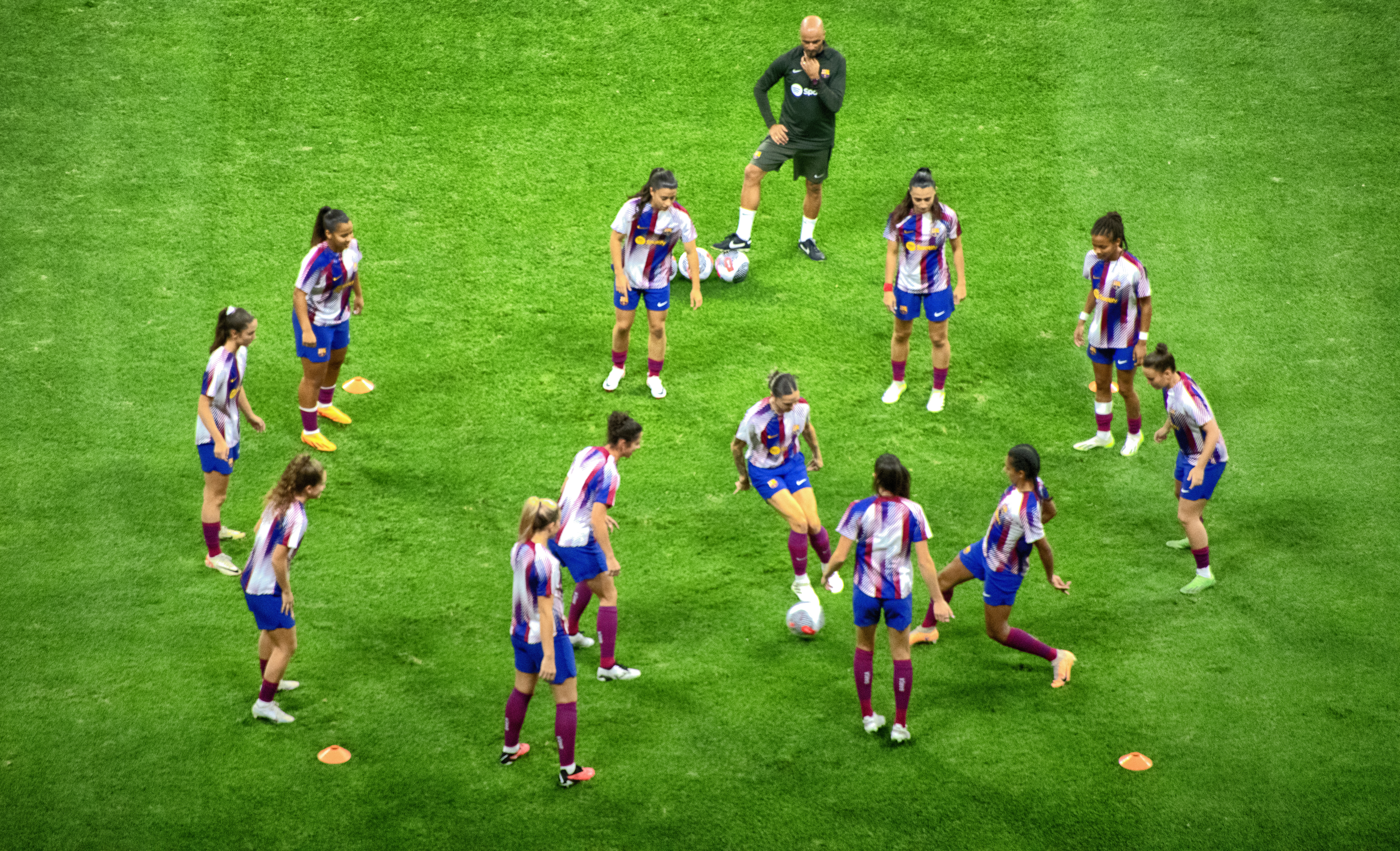
FC Barcelona Femení in a rondo drill in 2023

A rondo is a type of game, similar to keep away, that is used as a training drill in association football (soccer). In a rondo, one group of players is tasked with keeping possession of the ball while completing a series of passes, while a smaller group of players (sometimes a single player) tries to take possession.

Rondos occur close together, with the possessing group frequently encircling the opposing group. Unlike other possession games, in a rondo, players occupy predetermined positions. Rondos are said to improve player decision making, coordination, team play, creativity, competitiveness, and physical conditioning. The exercise has been used by major football organizations, including Derby County in the early 1970s, and later at FC Barcelona by Laureano Ruiz, and has been credited with remaking the modern game.

Dutch player and coach Johan Cruyff described the drill as follows: "Everything that goes on in a match, except shooting, you can do in a rondo. The competitive aspect, fighting to make space, what to do when in possession and what to do when you haven’t got the ball, how to play "one touch" football, how to counteract the tight marking and how to win the ball back".
