= Keep away =

Children's game

Keep Away, also called Monkey in the Middle, Piggy in the Middle, Pickle in a Dish, or Pickle in the Middle, or Monkey, is a children's game in which two or more players must pass a ball to one another, while another player (in the middle) attempts to intercept it. The game could be considered a reverse form of circle dodgeball, because instead of trying to hit people in the middle with the ball, players attempt to keep the ball away from them. The game is played worldwide.

== Rules ==
Keep Away is played by drawing a circle, about 10 feet (3.0 m) in diameter, on the ground. One person stands in the center (and is called it, the monkey, the piggy, or the pickle) and the rest stand outside the circle. A player outside the circle must then throw the ball through the circle to another person outside the circle with the goal being to prevent the person who is it from getting to the ball. This continues until the person who is it catches the ball or otherwise gains possession due to a failed catch, deflection, etc. An intended recipient who fails to catch the ball replaces the person in the middle, unless they fail before the ball touches any part of their body. The ball may not be torn out of any of the players' hands. The monkey must not move from their spot until the other players start passing it to each other.

While the game is often played for fun, it is also frequently used as a form of bullying, where a personal item (such as a backpack) is taken from the victim and the bullies throw it between each other as the victim tries to catch it.

== Variations ==
Like other children's games, this game has many variations to shape it in the manner they like to play. Some common variations are:

- Playing with a larger area and the person who is it only has to touch the ball instead of catch it.
- The ball must bounce at least once in the circle on a pass to prevent high lobbing passes which can give taller children an unfair advantage.
- When the person who is it catches the ball, they must get outside the circle with the ball without getting tagged by the thrower to make them it.
- The person outside the circle to last touch the ball becomes it instead of the last thrower. Thus the person who failed to catch the ball is it instead of the thrower.
- People with the ball outside the circle may not move until they throw it.
- None of the people outside the circle may move around and must throw and catch from a constant position.
- The people outside the circle must throw it within a certain amount of time, usually five seconds. This keeps the pace of the game high and prevents players from hogging the ball.
- Playing with larger areas with multiple people being it and even multiple balls.
- There isn't a circle; sometimes the one who is it tries to catch the ball while other players tackle the ball and pass to each other.
- Similar to a Pickle, or "Rundown" in a game of baseball, two basemen throw a ball back and forth. A third player who is it remains safely touching a base, until they decides to make a play (run) for the other base. Either of the two basemen must physically tag the runner with the ball in hand to count the runner out. This is done by tossing the ball back and forth between the basemen, forcing the runner to change direction, while the basemen close the distance to the runner, until either the runner is safe at a base, or successfully tagged. When successfully tagged, the runner and the baseman exchange places, and the game continues.
- When the "it" player catches the ball, then drops the ball, then the two other players can tackle the "it" person, or the it person can tackle the two other players to prevent them from getting the ball. You can also play this variation with basic American football rules and you could play with an American football.

== Naming ==
The name of the game varies with region. In the United States, the descriptive name Keep Away seems to prevail, while Canadian children commonly call the game either Pig in the Middle (Western Canada) or Monkey in the Middle (Eastern Canada, parts of New England, and parts of the Midwest). In the UK, Australia and New Zealand the name Piggy in the Middle is used (almost) exclusively. The game is also common in Germany, called "Schweinchen in der Mitte" (Piggy in the Middle) or "Dummer Hans" (Silly John), in Turkey under a name which translates to Rat in the Middle, in Denmark where it is known as what translates into Butter blob, in the Netherlands they call it "Lummelen" or, less commonly, "Aap in het Midden" [lit: "Monkey in the Middle"] and Silly Johnny in Poland. In Egypt, the name of the game translates as The Indecisive Dog. In Iran, the name "Vasati" is used. In Greece, it is called "koroido" which translates into "sucker". In Israel, the name of the game translates into "Donkey in the middle". In New York City it is also called "Salugi".

While the name Keep Away is self-explanatory, the origin of some of the other titles are less clear. Monkey in the Middle is likely to have arisen because the middle player jumps and waves their arms around like a monkey. The names Piggy in the Middle and Pickle in a Dish are of unknown derivation.

"Pickle in the middle" derives from the game of baseball. When the base runner is caught off base between two opposing players, one of whom has the ball, they are "in a pickle" (that is, in trouble).

== Other meanings ==
In America, the term pig in the middle is sometimes used as slang for being under pressure from both sides of a dispute. The similar term piggy in the middle means the same in the United Kingdom.

== Appearances in media ==
- The British rock band The Rutles, featuring Eric Idle, released a single called "Piggy in the Middle", which is featured in the 1978 documentary film All You Need is Cash.
- In The Adventures of Spot episode "Spot Goes to the Park", Spot and his friends play Monkey in the Middle.
- In the Dexter's Laboratory episode "The Bus Boy", Gwen takes Dexter's pencil out of his shirt pocket and plays "Keep Away" with Becky.
- In the Rugrats episode "Touchdown Tommy", Angelica Pickles plays Keep Away with the babies using a bottle of chocolate milk to pass from baby to baby, while Angelica is the person in the middle that is trying to grab the bottle of chocolate milk to drink.
- In the video game Mario Party for the Nintendo 64, there is a mini-game called "Key-Pa-Way" where players have to keep a key away from mechanical enemies.
- In the guide to daydreaming on Ned's Declassified School Survival Guide, Billy Loomer and Jerry Crony play "Keep Away" with Susan Crabgrass's bookbag.
- In the Monk episode "Mr. Monk and the Election", Adrian reveals that he played a lot of "Keep Away" in middle school. Later, he solves the episode's murder investigation while playing keep away with Natalie's car keys.
- in CONQUEST: The Chronicles of the Invaders, by John Connolly and Jennifer Ridyard, Ch. 57, people who need to bathe in a loch are playing piggy-in-the-middle with a bar of wet soap.
- The Finnish metal band Waltari has a song called "Piggy in the Middle" off of their album So Fine!.
- In the movie The Sandlot, the kids play pickle in the middle and Benny "pickles" the Beast to retrieve an autographed baseball.
- In the 2021 film version of West Side Story, Tony tries to convince Riff to call off the rumble by playing Keep Away with the latter's newly-bought gun, as part of the musical number "Cool."

== See also ==
- Rondo (game)
