= Rondo (2018 film) =

2018 thriller film directed by Drew Barnhardt

- Film poster
- Directed by: Drew Barnhardt
- Written by: Drew Barnhardt
- Produced by: Guy Clark
- Starring: G.C. Clark; Ketrick 'Jazz' Copeland; Reggie De Morton; Luke Sorge
- Cinematography: John Bourbonais
- Edited by: Lionel Footstander
- Music by: Ryan Franks; Scott Nickoley
- Distributed by: Artsploitation Films
- Release dates: July 27, 2018 (Fantasia Film Festival); May 7, 2019
- Running time: 90 minutes
- Country: United States
- Language: English

Rondo is a 2018 American thriller film written and directed by Drew Barnhardt. The movie was first shown on July 7, 2018, at the Fantasia Film Festival and was released on video and on demand on May 7, 2019.

== Plot ==
A veteran gets involved in a world of sex, crime, and murder when he's given a special and mysterious drug.

== Cast ==
- G.C. Clark as Gregory
- Ketrick 'Jazz' Copeland as DeShawn
- Reggie De Morton as Lurdell
- Luke Sorge as Paul

== Release ==
=== Reception ===
On review aggregator Rotten Tomatoes, Rondo has an approval rating of 80% based on 10 reviews. Patrick Bromley from Bloody Disgusting gave the film 4 out of 5 and wrote: "It may ultimately be an exploitation movie, but I love exploitation - especially when it's as smart, as unpredictable, and as nasty as Rondo is." Anton Bitel writing for the website "Projected Figures" stated: "Barnhardt's deft, knowingly daft handling of all these elements is a tour de force of highly assured genre filmmaking, and the mark of a real talent emerging from cinema's more perverse, less salubrious end." Adam Patterson from the "Film Pulse" didn't like "Rondo" giving it only 3 out of 10 stars and stating: "While Rondo plays with some interesting ideas, it fails to present anything of substance, resulting in a sloppy mess of an attempt to create a modern exploitation film."
