= USS Rondo (ID-2488) =

Dutch cargo ship that served in the United States Navy

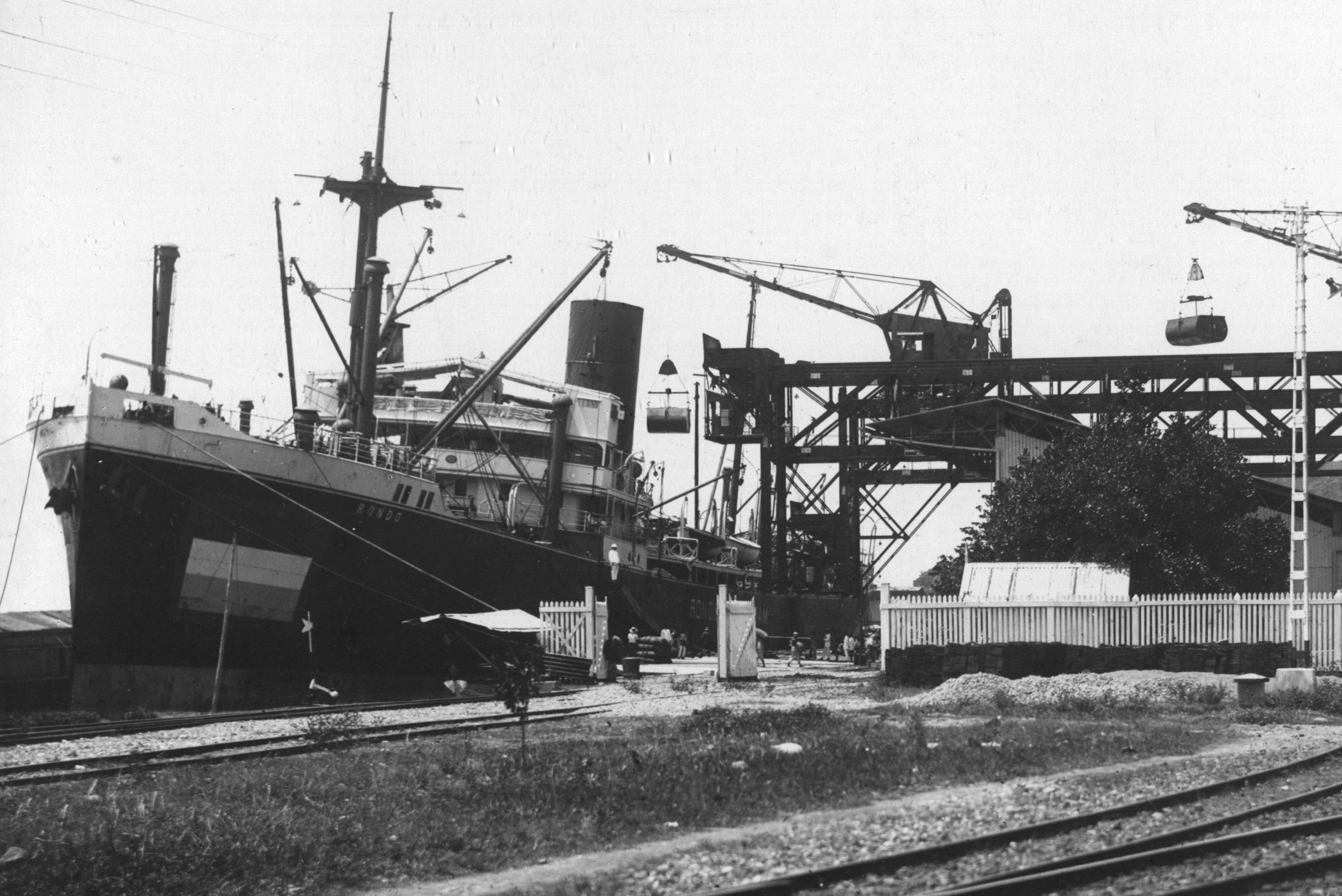
- Rondo with Dutch neutrality markings in the port of Emmahaven, before her US Navy service

History
- Name: Rondo
- Owner: 1914: Netherland Line; 1918: US Shipping Board; 1919: Netherland Line
- Operator: (United States) US Navy (1918–19)
- Port of registry: (Netherlands) Amsterdam
- Builder: Rotterdamsche Droogdok Maats
- Yard number: 42
- Laid down: 17 October 1913
- Launched: 26 September 1914
- Completed: 9 December 1914
- Acquired: by US Govt, 21 March 1918
- Commissioned: into US Navy, 28 March 1918
- Decommissioned: from US Navy, 21 June 1919
- Identification: code letters PRMF; 1918: call sign PHM; 1918: ID number ID–2488
- Fate: Scrapped in 1933

General characteristics
- Type: cargo ship
- Tonnage: 7,549 GRT, 4,759 NRT, 4,755 DWT
- Displacement: 15,300 tons
- Length: 450.3 ft (137.3 m)
- Beam: 55.9 ft (17.0 m)
- Draft: 26 ft 11 in (8.20 m)
- Depth: 35.6 ft (10.9 m)
- Depth of hold: 35 ft 7 in (10.85 m)
- Decks: 2
- Installed power: 829 NHP, 5,300 ihp
- Propulsion: 1 × screw; 1 × triple-expansion engine
- Speed: 13 knots (24 km/h)
- Capacity: cargo: 542,000 cubic feet (15,300 m^{3}) grain; 496,000 cubic feet (14,000 m^{3}) bale; passengers: 10 × 1st class
- Complement: in US Navy, 70
- Armament: 1 × 5-inch/51-caliber gun; 1 × 3-inch/50-caliber gun

USS Rondo (ID-2488) was a Dutch cargo steamship that was built for Stoomvaart Mattschappij Nederland ("Netherland Line") in 1914. She served in the United States Navy from March 1918 until June 1919. She was scrapped in 1933.

This was the first of two Netherland Line ships to be called Rondo. The second was a Type C3-class ship built in 1946 and scrapped in 1971. She was also the second US Navy ship to be called Rondo. The first was the motorboat USS Rondo (SP-90), which in April 1918 was renamed USS SP-90 to avoid confusion.

== Building and identification ==
Rotterdamsche Droogdok Maatschappij built Rondo in Rotterdam for Netherland Line as yard number 42. She was laid down on 17 October 1913, launched on 26 September 1914 and completed on 9 December 1914. Her registered length was 450.3 ft (137.3 m), her beam was 55.9 ft (17.0 m) and her depth was 35.6 ft (10.9 m). Her tonnages were 7,549 GRT, 4,759 NRT, 4,755 DWT. Her holds had capacity for 542,000 cubic feet (15,300 m^{3}) of grain or 496,000 cubic feet (14,000 m^{3}) of baled cargo. She also had berths for ten first class passengers.

She had a single screw, driven by a three-cylinder triple-expansion steam engine. It was rated at 829 NHP or 5,300 ihp, and gave her a speed of 13 knots (24 km/h).

Netherland Line registered Rondo at Amsterdam. Her code letters were PRMF. By 1917 she was equipped for wireless telegraphy. By 1918 her call sign was PHM.

== US service ==
On 21 March 1918 the United States Customs Service seized Rondo under angary at New York. She was one of 89 Dutch ships seized in US ports that day under Proclamation 1436.

31 of the seized Dutch ships were commissioned into the US Navy. Rondo was commissioned on 28 March, with the ID number ID–2488. She was assigned to the Naval Overseas Transportation Service. She was fitted with one 5-inch/51-caliber gun and one 3-inch/50-caliber gun as defensive armament.

On 12 April Rondo left New York for Norfolk, Virginia, where she loaded Army supplies for the American Expeditionary Forces. Between 7 May and 5 September she made two transatlantic round trips in convoys between the USA and France, on which she discharged cargo at La Pallice, Le Verdon-sur-Mer, and Bordeaux.

In September 1918 Rondo was refitted to transport horses under United States Shipping Board account. She sailed to Uruguay, reaching Montevideo on 16 February 1919. There she embarked horses, which she took to Boston.

Rondo was later assigned to take food to Europe. She suffered engine trouble, for which she returned to port. She reached Falmouth, Cornwall on 28 May 1919, and continued to Amsterdam, where she was decommissioned and returned to her owners on 21 June.

== Fate ==
Rondo resumed merchant service with Netherland Line. In April 1933 she was sold to SA Ricuperi Metallici of Turin. On 17 April she arrived in Genoa, Italy, to be scrapped.

== Bibliography ==
- Lloyd's Register of Shipping. Vol. II.–Steamers. London: Lloyd's Register of Shipping. 1917 – via Internet Archive.
- The Marconi Press Agency Ltd (1918). The Year Book of Wireless Telegraphy and Telephony. London: The Wireless Press, Ltd.
