= USS Rondo (SP-90) =

Patrol vessel of the United States Navy

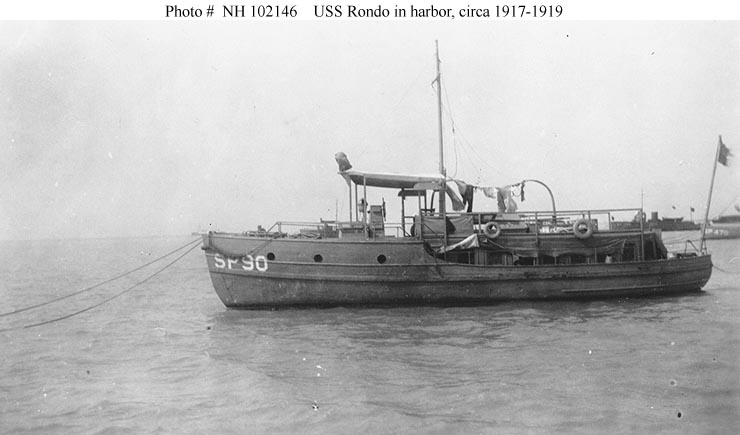
- USS Rondo during World War I.

History

United States
- Name: USS Rondo (May 1917-April 1918); USS SP-90 (April 1918-September 1919)
- Namesake: Rondo was a previous name retained; SP-90 was her section patrol number
- Builder: Rhode River Shipbuilding Company, Rhode River, Maryland
- Completed: 1915
- Acquired: 16 May 1917
- Commissioned: 14 November 1917
- Stricken: 4 October 1919
- Fate: Wrecked 9 September 1919
- Notes: Operated as private motorboat Rondo 1915-1917

General characteristics
- Type: Patrol vessel
- Tonnage: 20 tons
- Length: 50 ft (15 m)
- Beam: 15 ft (4.6 m)
- Draft: 3 ft 3 in (0.99 m)
- Speed: 9 knots
- Complement: 6
- Armament: 1 × 1-pounder gun; 1 × machine gun

The first USS Rondo (SP-90), later USS SP-90, was an armed motorboat that served in the United States Navy as a patrol vessel from 1917 to 1919.

Rondo was a civilian motorboat built in 1915 by the Rhode River Shipbuilding Company on the Rhode River in Maryland. The U.S. Navy acquired her on 16 May 1917 for World War I service as a patrol boat, and commissioned as USS Rondo (SP-90) on 14 November 1917.

Rondo served on patrol duty in Florida waters, operating out of Key West, Marathon, Long Key, and Bahia Honda Viaduct at Bahia Honda Key, through the end of the war. In April 1918, she was renamed USS SP-90, presumably to avoid confusion with the cargo ship USS Rondo (ID-2488), which was commissioned the previous month.

While anchored in North Beach Basin at Key West on 9 September 1919, SP-90 was among eight patrol boats completely destroyed by a hurricane. All recovered wreckage from SP-90 and the other seven boats was burned or turned into stores.

SP-90 was stricken from the Navy List on 4 October 1919.
