= Ara =

Ara may refer to:

== Biology ==
- Ara (bird), a genus of parrots
- Ara (fish) (Niphon spinosus), a species of fish
- L-arabinose operon, also known as ara

== Places ==
- Ara (mountain), a mountain in Armenia
- Ara, Armenia, a village in Armenia
- Ara, Bihar, a city in India
- Ara, Ramgarh, a town in Jharkhand, India
- Ara, Ranchi, a town in Jharkhand, India
- Ara, Iran, a village in Iran
- 'Ara, a village in Israel
- Ara (lake), a lake in Norway
- Arakawa River (disambiguation), also known as Ara, several rivers in Japan
- River Ara, Ireland

== People ==
=== Given name ===
- Ara the Beautiful, a legendary Armenian hero
- Ara Ball, Canadian film director
- Ara Bartlett (fl. 1825–1880), American lawyer and judge
- Ara Dinkjian (born 1958), Armenian oud player and composer
- Go Ara (born 1990), South Korean actress and model
- Ara Parseghian (1923–2017), American football player and coach
- Yoo Ara (born 1992), South Korean singer and dancer; leader of the girl group Hello Venus
- Ara Guler (1928-2018), Armenian-Turkish photojournalist
- Ara, a diminutive of the Russian feminine given name Avrora (a form of Aurora)
- Ara Spence (1793–1866), Justice of the Maryland Court of Appeals

=== Surname ===
- Arilena Ara (born 1998), Albanian singer also known mononymously as Arilena
- Guido Ara (1888–1975), Italian association football player
- Rachel Ara (born 1965), British conceptual and data artist
- Seiji Ara (born 1974), Japanese race car driver
- Zinat Ara (born 1953), Bangladeshi justice

== Media ==
- Ara (film), a 2008 Turkish drama directed by Ümit Ünal
- Ara (newspaper), a Catalan-language daily newspaper from Barcelona
- "Ara", a song by Brymo from The Son of a Kapenta
- Ara, Zeynep Bastık's Turkish cover of "Paro" by Nej'
- Ara: History Untold, turn-based grand strategy video game

== Other uses ==
- Ara (ancient Rome)
- Ara (constellation)
- Ara (goddess), a Mesopotamian goddess
- A'ra, a pre-Islamic Arabian god
- Ara (drink), traditional Bhutanese wine
- ISO 639-2 and -3 language codes for Arabic
- Ara Institute of Canterbury, Christchurch, New Zealand
- Project Ara, a modular phone initiative by Google
- Hape people, a Native American group also called the Ara

== See also ==
- ARA (disambiguation) (acronym)
- Ara Ara, an ethnic group of Australia
- Ara Gaya, a city-state kingdom in the Gaya confederacy, in modern-day Haman County, South Korea
- Arra (disambiguation)
- Arrah (disambiguation)
- McAra (disambiguation)
