= ARA =

ARA may refer to:

== Geography ==
- ARA region, a group of ports in Antwerp, Rotterdam, and Amsterdam

== Media and the arts ==
- African Reference Alphabet, No longer used alphabet for Africa
- Artistička Radna Akcija, compilation album released in former Yugoslavia
- Associate of the Royal Academy, denoting membership in the British Royal Academy of Arts
- ARA News, an online Arabic and English language news service focussed on Syrian and Kurdish events
- Ara (newspaper), a Catalan daily Spanish newspaper founded on 2010

== Organizations ==
- Academic Research Alliance, an organization created to involve students in scientific activities
- Alliance for Retired Americans, a senior citizen organization
- American Relief Administration, a relief mission after World War I
- Amateur Rowing Association, the governing body of rowing in the United Kingdom, now renamed British Rowing
- Amateurs Radio Algeriens, the national amateur radio organization of Algeria
- American Radio Association, a national AFL-CIO affiliated labor union representing U.S. Flag Merchant Marine Licensed Communications and Electronics Officers
- American Railway Association, precursor to the Association of American Railroads
- American Rally Association, governing body of rallying and championship in the United States
- Anti-Racist Action, a network of anti-racist activists
- Anti-Racist Alliance, a defunct anti-racist organization in the United Kingdom
- Applied Research Associates, a research and engineering company
- Arab Rescue Army, a volunteer army during the 1948 Palestine war
- Arcade and Attica Railroad, a railroad in North Java, New York
- Archives and Records Association, professional body for UK and Irish archivists, archive conservators and records managers
- Assets Recovery Agency, a British agency for the recovery of the proceeds of crime
- Athénée Royal d'Auderghem, a school in Brussels, Belgium
- Australasian Raptor Association, a special interest group of the Royal Australasian Ornithologists Union

== Military ==
- Aerial rocket artillery, helicopter artillery units used by the U.S. Army in the Vietnam War mainly to engage ground targets
- Armada de la República Argentina, the Argentine Navy (Argentine Navy ships use ARA as a name prefix, just as the US Navy uses USS)
- Armenian Revolutionary Army, an armed militant group
- Aryan Republican Army, white nationalist criminal group
- Australian Regular Army

== Government ==
- Auckland Regional Authority, a former local government council in New Zealand

== Sciences ==
- Angiotensin II receptor antagonist, more often called angiotensin receptor blocker (ARB)
- Aldosterone receptor antagonist (mineralocorticoid receptor antagonist, that is, antimineralocorticoid)
- Ant-based Routing Algorithm, a wireless mesh network routing protocol; see Swarm intelligence
- AppleTalk Remote Access, a communications protocol
- Audio Random Access, an extension to audio plug-in interfaces
- Arachidonic acid (also AA), as found in breast milk and infant formula
- The Arrow-Pratt measure of absolute risk aversion
- Askaryan Radio Array (ARA), a GZK neutrino detector based on the Askaryan effect and will be positioned in the Antarctic ice sheet

== Computer science ==
- Application release automation

== People ==
- Amedeo Rocco Armentano (1886–1966), Italian esotericist and musician

== Finance ==
- Annual Report and Account, the cornerstone of corporate reporting

== See also ==
- Ara (disambiguation)
