= Ara River =

Ara River may refer to:

- Arakawa River (disambiguation), several rivers in Japan
- River Ara, Ireland

== See also ==
- Ara (disambiguation)
- Ara Canal, a canal linking the Han River to the Yellow Sea
- Rambi Ara, a river and major tributary to the River Jhelum
