= SS Koningin der Nederlanden =

Dutch passenger steamship that was a US troopship in the First World War

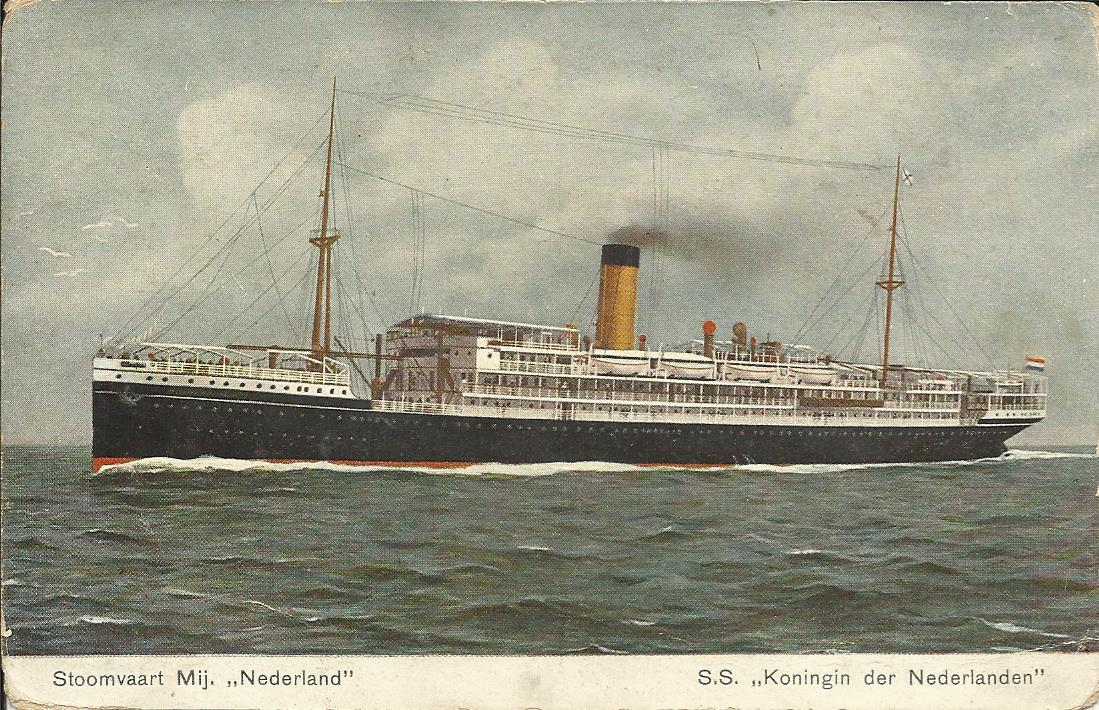
- Postcard of Koningin der Nederlanden

History
- Name: Koningin der Nederlanden
- Namesake: Wilhelmina of the Netherlands
- Owner: Netherland Line
- Operator: US US Navy (1918–19)
- Port of registry: (Netherlands) Amsterdam
- Route: Amsterdam – Batavia
- Ordered: 1909
- Builder: Nederlandsche SM, Amsterdam
- Cost: 2,234,387 guilders
- Yard number: 108
- Laid down: 1 July 1910
- Launched: 15 March 1911
- Completed: 12 July 1911
- Acquired: by US Government, 20 March 1918
- Commissioned: into US Navy, 4 April 1918
- Decommissioned: from US Navy, 7 November 1919
- Refit: 1919
- Identification: code letters PHMB; by 1914: call sign PFO; 1918: ID number ID-2708; US Navy code letters GBJQ
- Fate: Scrapped in 1932

General characteristics
- Type: passenger ship
- Tonnage: 1912: 8,176 GRT, 4,983 NRT, 6,650 DWT; 1927: 8,205 GRT, 4,984 NRT
- Length: 473.0 ft (144.2 m) overall; 455.2 ft (138.7 m) registered
- Beam: 55.2 ft (16.8 m)
- Draft: 26 ft 5 in (8.05 m)
- Depth: 33.8 ft (10.3 m)
- Decks: 2
- Installed power: 1,093 NHP, 6,500 ihp
- Propulsion: 2 × screws; 2 × quadruple expansion engines
- Speed: 14 1/2 knots (27 km/h)
- Capacity: passengers: 1910: 136 × 1st class, 94 × 2nd class, 38 × 3rd class, 40 × steerage; cargo: 285,000 cu ft (8,100 m^{3}) grain; 253,000 cu ft (7,200 m^{3}) bale
- Troops: 2,200
- Complement: in US Navy: 221
- Crew: 160
- Sensors & processing systems: submarine signalling; by 1927: wireless direction finding
- Armament: in US Navy: 4 × 6-inch/50-caliber guns; 2 × 1-pounder guns; 2 × machine guns
- Notes: sister ship: Prinses Juliana

SS Koningin der Nederlanden was a Dutch passenger steamship. She was built in 1911 for Stoomvaart Maatschappij Nederland (SMN, or "Netherland Line"), which ran scheduled passenger and mail services between Amsterdam and Java.

In the First World War she was a US troopship. The Netherlands were neutral, but in 1918 the USA seized her under angary. She returned to civilian service in 1919, and was scrapped in the Netherlands in 1932.

Koningin der Nederlanden means "Queen of the Netherlands". It refers to Queen Wilhelmina, who reigned from 1890 until 1948.

== Building ==
Between 1909 and 1911 the Nederlandsche Scheepsbouw Maatschappij in Amsterdam built a pair of ships for SMN. The first was laid down on 15 July 1909 as yard number 105, and launched on 1 June 1910 as Prinses Juliana. Her sister ship was laid down on 1 July 1910 as yard number 108, launched on 15 March 1911 as Koningin der Nederlanden, and completed on 12 July 1911. On 12 July she made her sea trials, on which she achieved a top speed of 15 knots (28 km/h).

Koningin der Nederlanden's lengths were 473.0 ft (144.2 m) overall and 455.2 ft (138.7 m) registered. Her beam was 55.2 ft (16.8 m) and her depth was 33.8 ft (10.3 m). Her tonnages were 8,176 GRT, 4,983 NRT, and 6,650 DWT. She had berths for 308 passengers: 136 in first class, 94 in second class, 38 in third class, and 40 in steerage. The combined capacity of her holds was 285,000 cu ft (8,100 m^{3}) of grain, or 253,000 cu ft (7,200 m^{3}) of baled cargo.

The ship had twin screws, each driven by a four-cylinder quadruple expansion steam engine built by Nederlandsche Fabriek van Werktuigen en Spoorwegmaterieel. The combined power of her twin engines was rated at 1,093 NHP or 6,500 ihp, and gave her a speed of 14 1/2 knots (27 km/h).

SMN registered the ship at Amsterdam. Her code letters were PHMB. She was equipped for submarine signalling, and the Marconi Company supplied and operated her wireless telegraph, By 1914 her wireless call sign was PFO.

Koningin der Nederlanden joined Prinses Juliana on SMN's route between Amsterdam and Batavia via Southampton, Lisbon, Tangier, Algiers, Genoa, and the Suez Canal.

== Troop ship ==
In 1918 the Entente Powers gave the Dutch government an ultimatum to place 600,000 GRT of its merchant ships at their disposal by 18 March. On 20 March, President Woodrow Wilson ordered the seizure under angary of 89 Dutch ships in US ports. The United States Customs Service seized Koningin der Nederlanden in San Francisco.

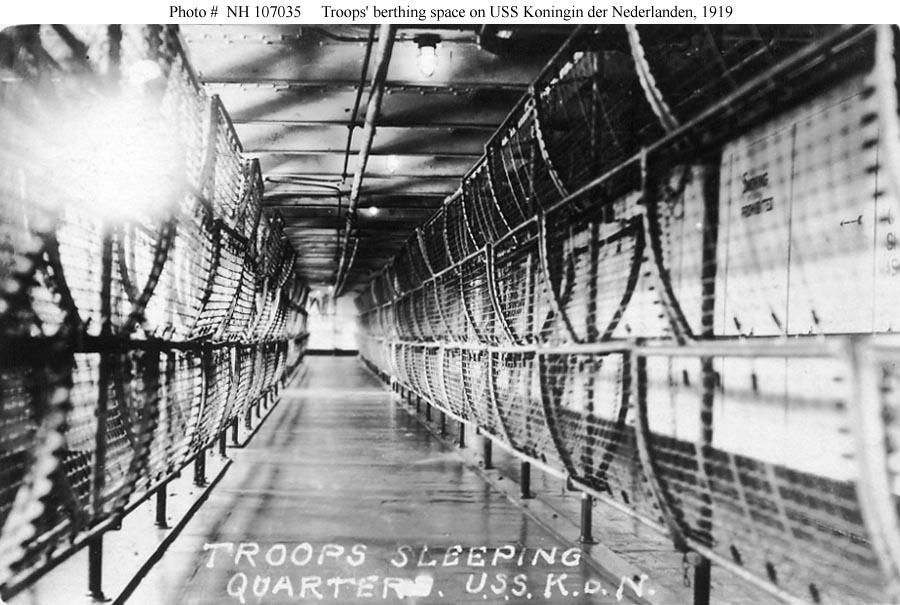
Troop dormitory aboard Koningin der Nederlanden

The ship was commissioned on 4 April 1918 as USS Koningin der Nederlanden, with the Naval Registry Identification Number ID-2708. Her first commanding officer was Lieutenant commander NT Payne, USNRF. She was assigned to the Naval Overseas Transportation Service. She left San Francisco on 5 November 1918, and went via the Panama Canal to Norfolk, Virginia for conversion into a troop ship. She was defensively armed with four 6-inch/50-caliber guns, two 1-pounder guns and two machine guns.

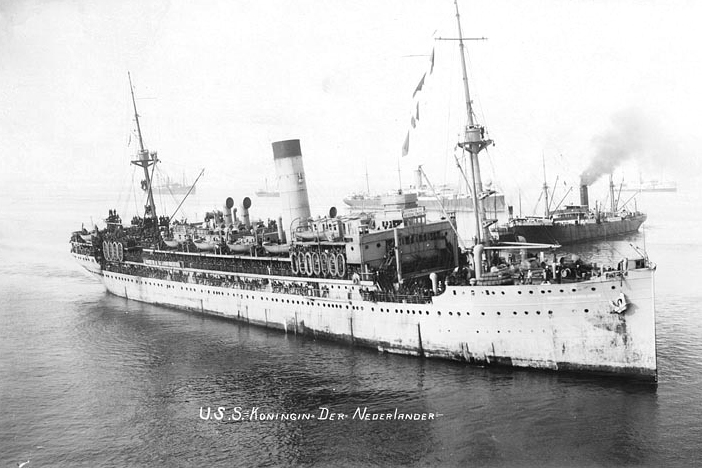
Koningin der Nederlanden as a troop ship, arriving in Newport News in 1919. Note her numerous Carley floats fore and aft.

On 6 August 1918 the ship was detached from the NOTS to the Cruiser and Transport Force. She embarked more than 2,200 troops of the American Expeditionary Forces to take to France. She made two more trips carrying troops from Norfolk to France. On the third trip she reached Brest on 9 November, two days before the Armistice with Germany. She then made five trips from France to US ports, in which she repatriated a total of more than 10,000 troops. On one trip she landed elements of the 88th Infantry Division at Newport News, Virginia on 4 June 1919. The US Navy decommissioned her on 7 November and returned her to her owners.

== Later career ==
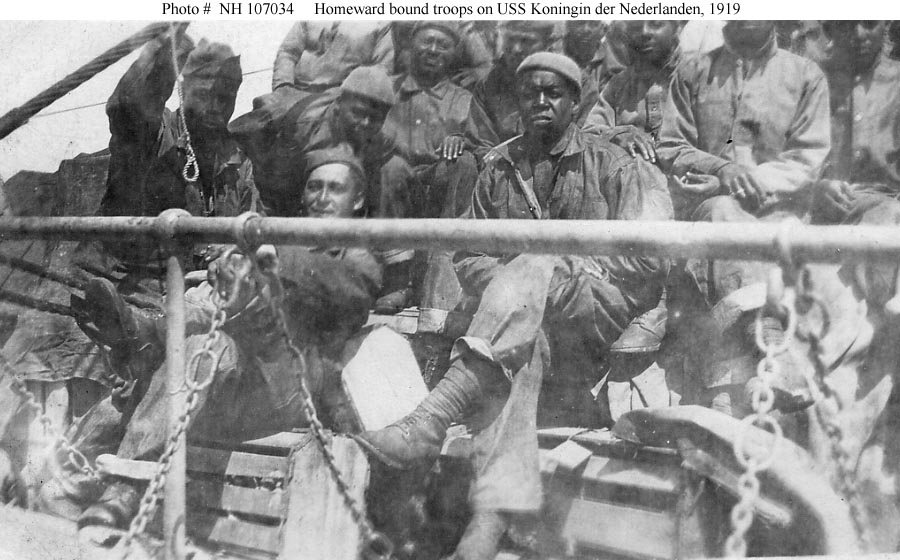
African-American troops returning from France to the USA aboard Koningin der Nederlanden in 1919

In 1919 SMN had the ship refitted at Amsterdam from a troop ship back to a civilian liner. In 1921 Isaac Israëls sailed on her to the Dutch East Indies. In 1924 the ship's after deck was enclosed.

By 1927 the ship was equipped with wireless direction finding. As built, she had three double-ended and two single-ended boilers, with a total heating surface of 16,316 square feet (1,516 m^{2}). They were heated by a total of 24 corrugated furnaces, with a combined had a grate area of 391 square feet (36 m^{2}). However, in 1926 or 1927 this was increased to three double-ended and three single-ended boilers, with a total heating surface to 18,536 square feet (1,722 m^{2}). Her corrugated furnaces were increased to 27, with a total grate area of 443 square feet (41 m^{2}). These increased raised her power to 1,192 NHP.

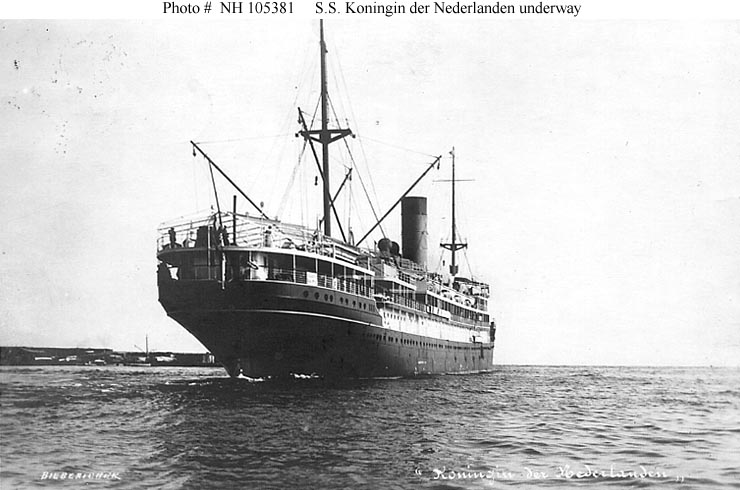
Koningin der Nederlanden seen from the stern

By January 1928, Koningin der Nederlanden's route between Amsterdam and Batavia was via Southampton, Algiers, Genoa, the Suez Canal, Colombo, Sabang, Belawan and Singapore. By May 1929, regular ports of call had been reduced to Amsterdam, Southampton, Algiers, and Genoa.

On 26 May 1930, Koninklijke Nederlandse Stoomboot-Maatschappij bought Prinses Juliana from SMN, and renamed her Costa Rica. In August 1930 KNSM planned to buy her sister ship Koningin der Nederlanden and rename her San Salvador. However, by 5 August 1931 she was laid up at Amsterdam, and needed a boiler inspection before she could return to service. On 2 November she was still laid up at Amsterdam. The results of an inspection were unsatisfactory, so KNSM cancelled the purchase.

On 15 February 1932 SMN sold the ship to Frank Rijsdijk's Industriëele Ondernemingen of Hendrik-Ido-Ambacht for scrap. On 21 February she made her final voyage to Rotterdam to be broken up.

== Bibliography ==
- Lloyd's Register of British and Foreign Shipping. Vol. II.–Steamers. London: Lloyd's Register of Shipping. 1912 – via Internet Archive.
- Lloyd's Register of Shipping. Vol. II.–Steamers and Motorships. London: Lloyd's Register of Shipping. 1927 – via Internet Archive.
- The Marconi Press Agency Ltd (1914). The Year Book of Wireless Telegraphy and Telephony. London: The Marconi Press Agency Ltd.
- Media related to Koningin der Nederlanden (ship, 1911) at Wikimedia Commons
