= Arra =

Arra or ARRA may refer to:

== Places ==
- Arra, Paschim Bardhaman, census town in West Bengal
- Arra, Purba Bardhaman, West Bengal
- Arra, Purulia, census town in West Bengal
- Arra, Chakwal, a village in Pakistan
- Arra, now part of Owney and Arra, County Tipperary, Ireland
- Arra Mountains, County Tipperary, Ireland

== Other uses ==
- Ajman Real Estate Regulatory Agency, of Ajman, United Arab Emirates
- American Recovery and Reinvestment Act of 2009
- ARRA (computer), the first Dutch computer
- Arra, extraterrestrial from the Space: 1999 episode "Collision Course".
- Arra legalovi, an extinct species of beetle in the family Salpingidae.

== People with the name ==
- Nikolin Arra (born 1991), Albanian basketball player

== See also ==
- Ara (disambiguation)
- ARA (disambiguation)
