= SS Prinses Juliana =

Several steamships were named SS Prinses Juliana after Juliana of the Netherlands (1909–2004). They include:

- Prinses Juliana (1909), a ferry that struck a mine in 1916, was beached, and scrapped
- Prinses Juliana (1910), a mail ship that was renamed Costa Rica in 1930 and sunk in 1941
- Prinses Juliana (1920), a ferry that was sunk by an air attack in 1940
