= SS Costa Rica =

Dutch passenger steamship that was a troopship in both world wars

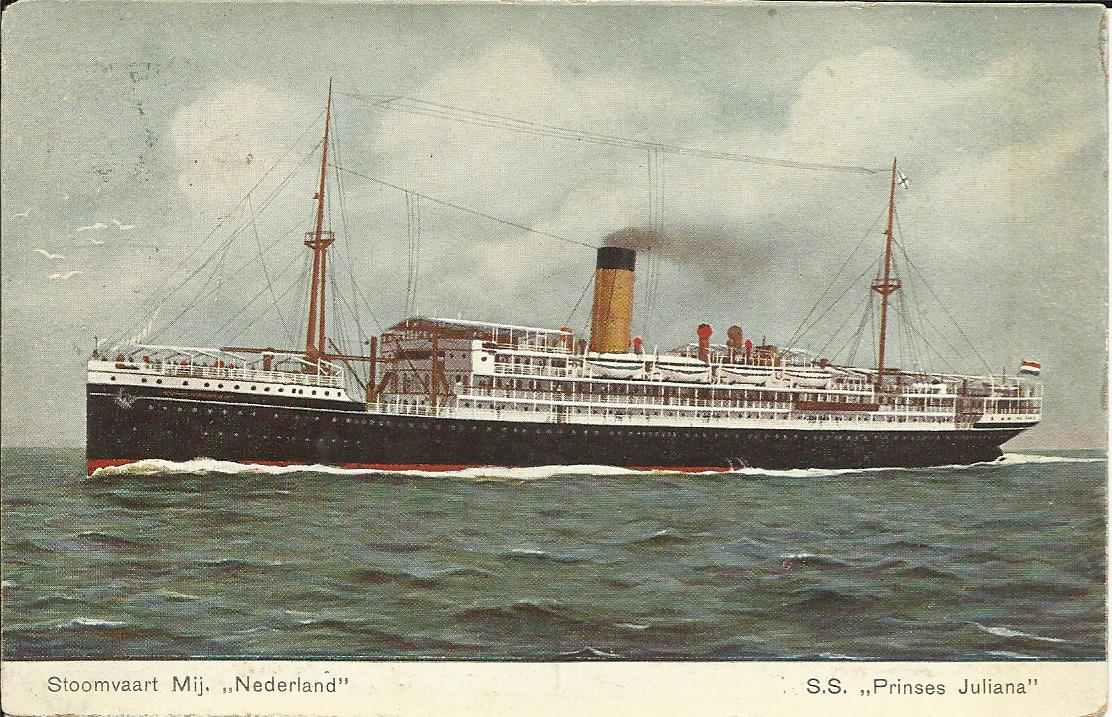
- Postcard of the ship as Prinses Juliana

History
- Name: 1910: Prinses Juliana; 1930: Costa Rica
- Namesake: 1910: Juliana of the Netherlands; 1930: Costa Rica
- Owner: 1910: Netherland Line; 1918: Shipping Controller; 1919: Netherland Line; 1930: KNSM
- Operator: 1918: P&O
- Port of registry: 1910: (Netherlands) Amsterdam; 1918: (United Kingdom) Hong Kong; 1919: (Netherlands) Amsterdam
- Route: 1910: Amsterdam – Batavia; 1930: Amsterdam – Colón; 1939: IJmuiden – Cristóbal
- Ordered: 24 March 1909
- Builder: Nederlandsche SM, Amsterdam
- Cost: 2,246,108 guiders
- Yard number: 105
- Laid down: 15 July 1909
- Launched: 1 June 1910
- Completed: 1 October 1910
- Maiden voyage: 1 October 1910
- Refit: 1924, 1930
- Identification: code letters PQNW (until 1930); call sign MNP (until 1913); call sign PFN (from 1914); code letters NLQV (1930–33); call sign PDMM (by 1934)
- Fate: Sunk by aircraft, 1941

General characteristics
- Type: passenger ship
- Tonnage: 1911: 8,085 GRT, 4,998 NRT, 7,080 DWT; 1931: 8,672 GRT, 4,978 NRT, 6,510 DWT
- Length: 473.0 ft (144.17 m) overall; 455.1 ft (138.7 m) registered
- Beam: 55.2 ft (16.8 m)
- Draught: 26 ft 5 in (8.05 m)
- Depth: 36.8 ft (11.2 m)
- Decks: 2
- Installed power: 1911: 1,094 NHP, 6,500 ihp; 1928: 1,192 NHP
- Propulsion: 2 × screws; 2 × quadruple expansion engines
- Speed: 14 1/2 knots (27 km/h)
- Capacity: passengers: 1910: 101 × 1st class, 74 × 2nd class, 34 × 3rd class, 140 × steerage; 1930: 254; cargo: 234,000 cu ft (6,600 m^{3}) bale
- Troops: about 2,800
- Sensors & processing systems: submarine signalling; by 1927: wireless direction finding
- Armament: from 1940: DEMS
- Notes: sister ship: Koningin der Nederlanden

SS Costa Rica was a Dutch passenger steamship. She was built in 1910 as Prinses Juliana for Stoomvaart Maatschappij Nederland (SMN, or "Netherland Line"), which ran scheduled passenger and mail services between Amsterdam and Java.

In 1930 Koninklijke Nederlandse Stoomboot-Maatschappij (KNSM or "Royal Netherlands Steamship Company") bought Prinses Juliana and renamed her Costa Rica. KNMS operated scheduled passenger and mail services between Amsterdam or IJmuiden and the Caribbean.

She was an Allied troop ship in both world wars. In the First World War the Netherlands were neutral, but in 1918 the United Kingdom seized Prinses Juliana under angary. In the Second World War Costa Rica became an Allied troop ship after the German invasion of the Netherlands in 1940. She took troops from Great Britain and South Africa to Egypt.

During the German invasion of Greece in April 1941, Costa Rica evacuated troops from the Peloponnese. German aircraft bombed her in the Sea of Crete. Royal Navy ships rescued her crew and the 2,600 troops she was carrying, and she sank without loss of life.

== Building ==
Between 1909 and 1911 the Nederlandsche Scheepsbouw Maatschappij in Amsterdam built a pair of ships for SMN. The first was laid down on 15 July 1909 as yard number 105, and launched on 1 June 1910. SMN had planned to call her Sarphati, after Dr Samuel Sarphati (1813–66). However, in April 1909 Princess Juliana was born, so the company renamed the planned ship after the new princess. Her mother Queen Wilhelmina launched the ship. On about 20 September 1910 Prinses Juliana made her sea trials, on which achieved a top speed of 15 1/2 knots (29 km/h).

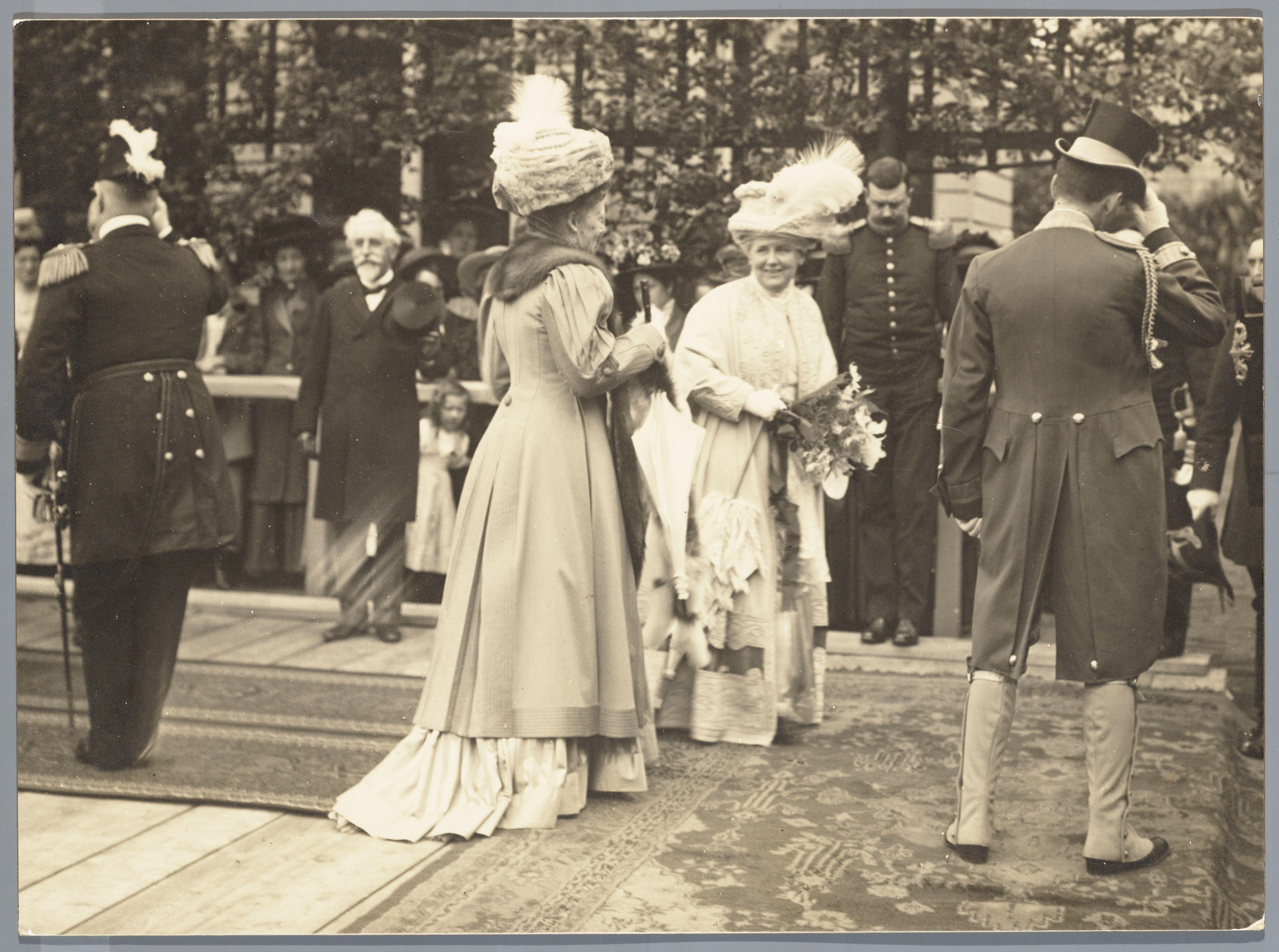
Queen Wilhelmina at the launch of Prinses Juliana on 1 June 1910

Her sister ship was laid down on 1 July 1910 as yard number 108, launched on 15 March 1911 as Koningin der Nederlanden, and completed on 12 July 1911.

Prinses Juliana's lengths were 473.0 ft (144.17 m) overall and 455.1 ft (138.7 m) registered. Her beam was 55.2 ft (16.8 m) and her depth was 36.8 ft (11.2 m). Her tonnages were 8,085 GRT, 4,998 NRT and 7,080 DWT. She had berths for 349 passengers: 101 in first class, 74 in second class, 34 in third class, 140 and in steerage. She had three holds: two forward and one aft. Their combined capacity was 234,000 cubic feet (6,600 m^{3}) for baled cargo.

The ship had twin screws, each driven by a four-cylinder quadruple expansion steam engine built by Nederlandsche Fabriek van Werktuigen en Spoorwegmaterieel. The combined power of her twin engines was rated at 1,094 NHP or 6,500 ihp, and gave her a speed of 14 1/2 knots (27 km/h).

SMN registered the ship at Amsterdam. Her code letters were PQNW. She was equipped for submarine signalling, and the Marconi Company supplied and operated her wireless telegraph, By 1913 her wireless call sign was MNP, but by 1914 this had been changed to PFN.

== Prinses Juliana ==
On 1 October 1910 Prinses Juliana was completed, and started her maiden voyage to Java. She called at Southampton, Lisbon, Tangier, and Genoa, passed through the Suez Canal, and called at Colombo, Sabang, and Singapore before reaching Java. By 1913 her regular route was from Amsterdam to Batavia via Southampton, Lisbon, Tangier, Algiers, Genoa, and the Suez Canal.

From 4 April 1917 her route was changed. She operated mail services from Batavia to San Francisco, Honolulu, Yokohama, Nagasaki, Hong Kong, Singapore and Sabang.

In 1918 the Entente Powers gave the Dutch government an ultimatum to place 600,000 GRT of its merchant ships at their disposal by 18 March. On 20 March, President Woodrow Wilson ordered the seizure under angary of 89 Dutch ships in US ports. The UK authorities also seized Dutch merchant ships in British Empire ports. The UK seized Prinses Juliana and registered her at Hong Kong. Her UK official number was 139580 and her code letters were THMR. She was vested in the Shipping Controller, who appointed P&O to manage her.

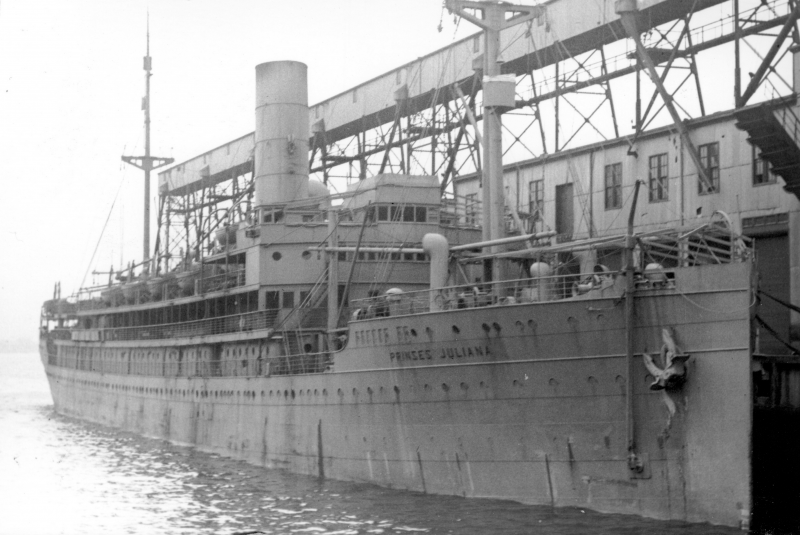
Prinses Juliana as a troop ship, in port in Boston in February 1919

According to two sources, the UK seized her on 23 or 28 March 1918. According to a newspaper report published in April 1918, SMN was still operating her, she had just called at the US port of Honolulu without being seized, she was on her way to San Francisco, and the US War Trade Board in Washington DC had stated that it would not seize her there either. However, this may have been disinformation, as it was in San Francisco that she was converted into a troop ship. She kept most of her Dutch crew, but P&O managed her for the US Cruiser and Transport Force. She left San Francisco on 5 May 1918, passed through the Panama Canal, and on 6 August embarked 2,800 troops of the American Expeditionary Forces to take to France.

After the Armistice of 11 November 1918, Prinses Juliana brought armed service personnel home to the USA. On 17 December 1918 she reached Pier 54 at the end of West 13th Street, Manhattan, carrying 111 passengers, including 41 United States Navy personnel. By 31 December she had re-crossed the Atlantic, and was in port in Liverpool. As a troop ship she made nine voyages in all, and carried a total of 17,622 troops. She completed her final trooping voyage on 19 August 1919 in New York, crossed the Atlantic to Amsterdam, and was returned to SMN on 2 September 1919.

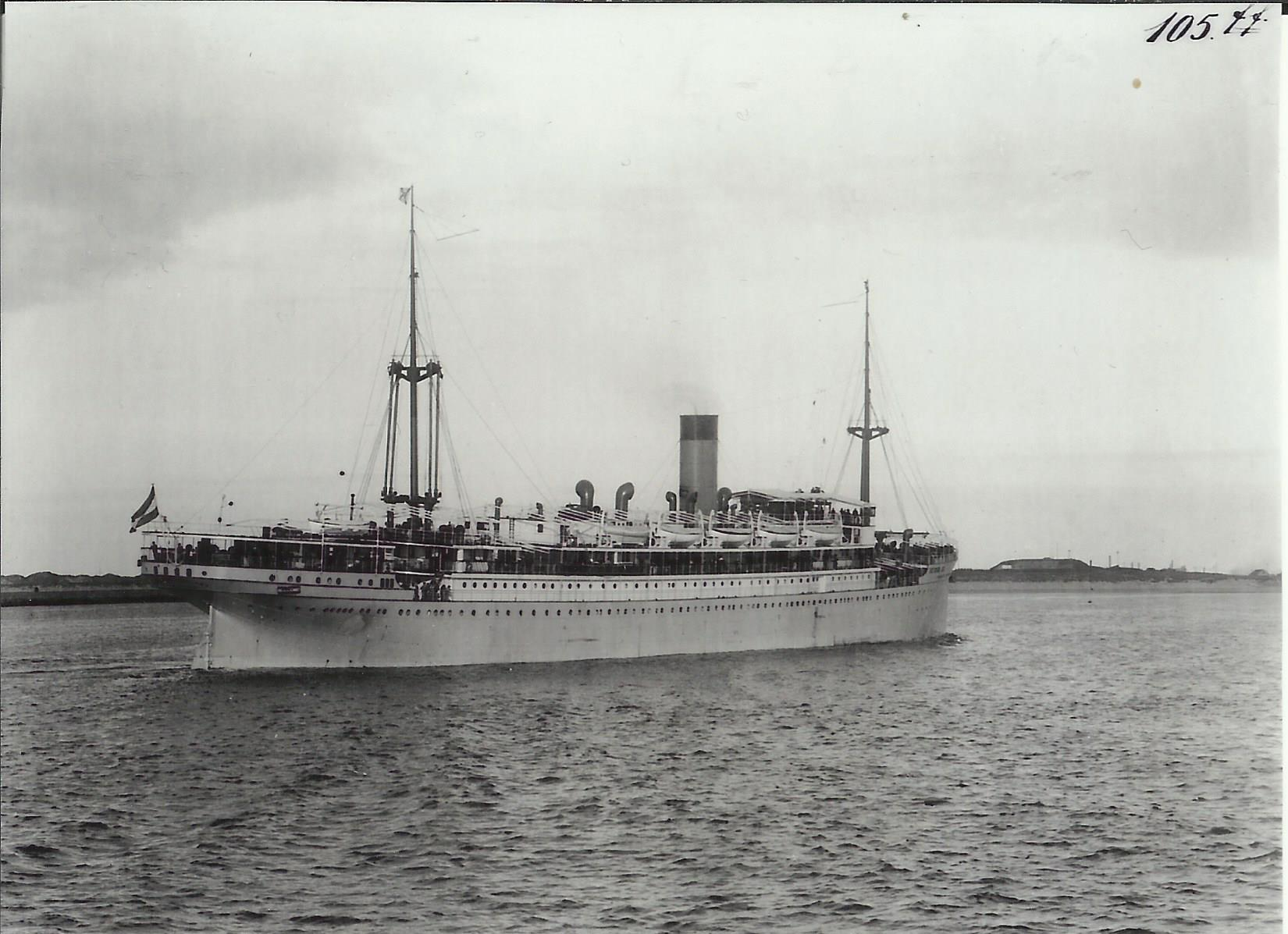
Prinses Juliana as she looked until her 1924 refit, with her hull painted pale grey

In 1924 Prinses Juliana's hull and superstructure was altered aft to add more passenger cabins. By 1927 she was equipped with wireless direction finding. As built, she had three double-ended and two single-ended boilers, with a total heating surface of 16,336 square feet (1,518 m^{2}). They were heated by a total of 24 corrugated furnaces, with a combined had a grate area of 391 square feet (36 m^{2}). However, in 1927 or 1928 this was increased to three double-ended and three single-ended boilers, with a total heating surface to 18,345 square feet (1,704 m^{2}). Her corrugated furnaces were increased to 27, with a total grate area of 444 square feet (41 m^{2}). These increased raised her power to 1,192 NHP.

By January 1928, Prinses Juliana's route between Amsterdam and Batavia was via Southampton, Algiers, Genoa, the Suez Canal, Colombo, Sabang, Belawan and Singapore. By May 1929, regular ports of call had been reduced to Amsterdam, Southampton, Algiers, and Genoa.

== Costa Rica ==
KNSM bought Prinses Juliana on 26 May 1930, and contracted Wilton-Fijenoord in Schiedam to refit her. Her total passenger capacity was reduced to 254. The forward sections of her promenade and boat decks, which had been open, were glazed in. A new outer casing was fitted over her funnel, and she was given a dummy second funnel to match. The refit increased her tonnages to 8,672 GRT and 6,510 DWT. She was renamed Costa Rica, and her code letters were changed to NLQV. On 22 September she made her sea trials, and on 17 October 1930 she began service on her new route from Amsterdam to Colón, Panama. In 1934 the four-letter call sign PDMM superseded her code letters and former call sign.

On 1 September 1939 Germany invaded Poland. A week later, on 8 September, Costa Rica called at Cristóbal in Panama. KNSM decided that because of the war, Prinses Juliana would cease to carry passengers, and her crew would be reduced accordingly. She would remain on her regular route, but as a cargo ship.

She then made her return voyage via Kingston, Jamaica, Barbados and Madeira. By then the French Navy and Royal Navy were blockading Germany, and were stopping neutral ships for inspection to ensure they were not carrying goods or people banned by the blockade. Costa Rica was held at an anchorage off Southend-on-Sea from 9 to 13 October, and then at The Downs on 14–15 October, before being allowed to proceed.

Costa Rica was in IJmuiden from 15 to 28 October 1939, when she began her next voyage. She was held at The Downs 29–30 October, then went via Barbados and Curaçao to Colón, where she arrived on 23 November. She returned via Barranquilla, Trinidad and Barbados, and then called at Southampton from 14 to 20 December. She anchored at Spithead from 20 to 25 December, and was held at The Downs 27–28 December, before returning to Ijmuiden.

Costa Rica was in IJmuiden from 28 December 1939 to 11 January 1940, when she began her next voyage. She was held at The Downs, and on 12–13 January at Southend-on-Sea. She called at Lisbon, Madeira, Trinidad and Curaçao, La Guaira (Venezuela) and was in Cristóbal 8–9 February. She returned via Curaçao, Trinidad, Barbados and Madeira, was held at The Downs from 6 to 10 March, and reached IJmuiden on 11 March.

The ship began her next voyage on 7 April 1940 from Amsterdam. She called at Curaçao and Cartagena, Colombia, and was under way to Cristóbal when Germany invaded the Netherlands on 10 May. She was in Cristóbal 11–14 May, by which time it seemed unlikely that she could return to The Netherlands.

Costa Rica went to Norfolk, Virginia, where she was in port 21–25 May. From there she went via Trinidad to Argentina, where she was in Buenos Aires from 18 June to 6 August and Bahía Blanca on 9 August. She then went via Montevideo to Freetown, Sierra Leone, where she joined Convoy SL 46 to Liverpool, where she landed a cargo of wheat.

The ship was in Liverpool from 23 September to 14 December 1940. There she was converted into a troop ship, and she was equipped to handle heavier cargo. She was in the Firth of Clyde on 16–18 December, embarked 1,114 troops, and then joined Convoy WS 5A, which dispersed at sea between 25 and 28 December. Costa Rica continued unescorted voa Freetown and Durban to Suez in Egypt, where she arrived on 16 February 1941. On 10 March 1941 the ship left Suez. She went via Port Sudan to Durban, where she was in port 26–31 March before returning to Suez.

== Operation Demon ==
On 6 April 1941 Germany invaded Greece. Costa Rica passed through the Suez Canal 21–22 April, when the UK launched Operation Demon to evacuate British and Empire forces from Greece. Costa Rica went to Alexandria, where she joined Ellerman Lines' City of Lincoln, British India SN Co's Dilwara, Khedivial Mail Line's Khedive Ismail, P Henderson & Co's Salween, and Royal Rotterdam Lloyd's Slamat, to form Convoy AG 14. The cruiser HMS Carlisle and destroyers Kandahar and Kingston escorted AG 14 to the Aegean Sea, where the merchant ships dispersed to different parts of the Greek coast to evacuate troops.

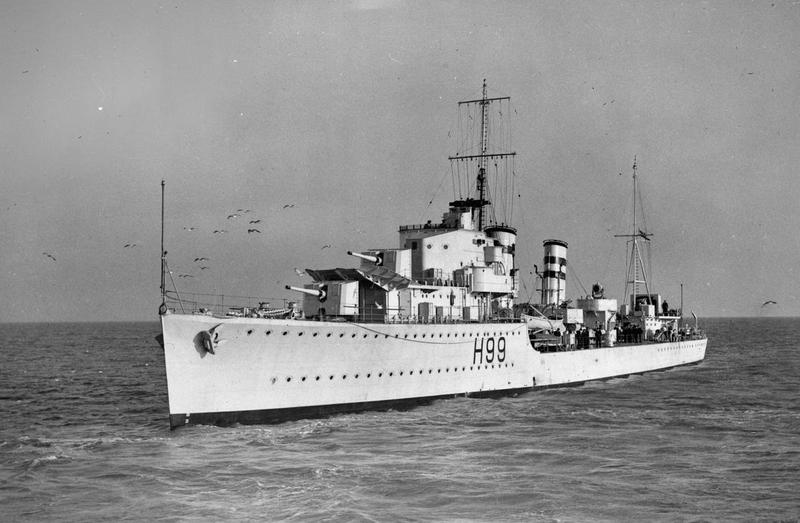
Hero, which towed Costa Rica and then took part in the rescue of her troops and crew

Costa Rica and Dilwara went to Kalamata in the Peloponnese. There Costa Rica embarked between 2,600 and 3,000 troops, mostly Australians and New Zealanders. She left early on the morning 27 April. Luftwaffe aircraft attacked at first light, but she and Dilwara reached Souda Bay in Crete, where they joined Khedive Ismail, Salween, Ellerman Lines' City of London, and the landing ship, infantry HMS Glengyle to form Convoy GA 14.

GA 14 left Souda Bay for Alexandria, but was attacked in the Sea of Crete by German aircraft. At either 10:00 or 14:00 hrs (sources differ), two or three bombs exploded in the sea off Costa Rica's port side, blowing a hole in her engine room and number 4 hold. No-one was killed. The destroyer Hero started to tow her, until it became clear that the troop ship could not be saved. The cruiser HMS Phoebe and destroyers Defender and Hereward joined Hero in rescuing all of her troops and crew, before Costa Rica sank at position 35°54′N 23°49′E, north of the Rodopos Peninsula in western Crete. Phoebe, Defender, Hereward, and Hero reached Alexandria on 29 April.

== Bibliography ==
- Lloyd's Register of British and Foreign Shipping. Vol. II.–Steamers. London: Lloyd's Register of Shipping. 1911 – via Internet Archive.
- Lloyd's Register of Shipping. Vol. II.–Steamers and Motorships. London: Lloyd's Register of Shipping. 1927 – via Internet Archive.
- Lloyd's Register of Shipping (PDF). Vol. II.–Steamers and Motorships of 300 Tons and Over. London: Lloyd's Register of Shipping. 1931 – via Southampton City Council.
- Lloyd's Register of Shipping (PDF). Vol. II.–Steamers and Motorships of 300 Tons and Over. London: Lloyd's Register of Shipping. 1934 – via Southampton City Council.
- The Marconi Press Agency Ltd (1913). The Year Book of Wireless Telegraphy and Telephony. London: The St Katherine Press.
- The Marconi Press Agency Ltd (1914). The Year Book of Wireless Telegraphy and Telephony. London: The Marconi Press Agency Ltd.
- Mercantile Navy List. London. 1919 – via Crew List Index Project.
- Media related to Prinses Juliana (ship, 1910) at Wikimedia Commons
