= ARA region =

Port and industrial region in Belgium and the Netherlands

ARA ports (in red) on a 2009 map of shipping routes in the North Sea

The ARA region is a port and industrial region in Belgium and the Netherlands, centred on the ports of Antwerp, Rotterdam and Amsterdam. Its name is an acronym formed from the initials of the three cities. The region is a centre for the handling and storage of bulk cargo, including petroleum products, chemicals and other raw materials.

The three ports, collectively known as the ARA ports, provide access from North Sea shipping routes to the European hinterland. Their proximity and connections to inland waterways, railways and roads allow them to function as a logistics hub for international trade.

== Hinterland connections ==
The ARA ports are linked by inland waterways to the Rhine and to industrial centres in Germany, France and Switzerland. The Scheldt–Rhine Canal, which runs from Antwerp to the Volkerak, forms part of the Amsterdam–Rotterdam–Flanders transport corridor.

Inland shipping plays a greater role in the ARA ports' hinterland transport than in that of Hamburg and ports of Bremen, where rail accounts for a larger share of container movements. A 2019 report by Germany's Federal Office for Goods Transport attributed this difference partly to the Rhine's capacity to accommodate larger inland vessels and to restrictions imposed by locks, bridges and water levels on the waterways serving the German ports.

In the 2017–2018 figures reproduced in that report, road transport accounted for more than half of container movements between Rotterdam or Antwerp and their hinterlands. Rail's share was 10% or less in all three ARA ports, compared with 46.4% in Bremerhaven and 45.2% in Hamburg in 2018. Inland shipping accounted for 3.1% and 2.4%, respectively, at the two German ports.

Modal share of container transport between the ARA ports and their hinterlands
| Mode | Rotterdam (2017) | Amsterdam (2017) | Antwerp (2018) |
|---|---|---|---|
| Road | 56% | 41% | 55% |
| Rail | 10% | 5% | 7% |
| Inland shipping | 34% | 55% | 38% |

The figures are reproduced as published; the Amsterdam percentages total 101%.

== Industry ==
The region contains oil refineries, tank farms and petrochemical plants. A 2022 overview published by the German petroleum distributor Erich Doetsch Mineralölhandels KG reported that around two-thirds of Germany's imports of refined petroleum products arrived through Amsterdam, Rotterdam and Antwerp. A 2024 report by the energy news agency Energate described Antwerp's chemical-industry cluster as the world's second largest. Rotterdam's oil spot market influences petroleum-product prices in Germany and central Europe.

Pipelines connect industrial sites in the ports with one another and with destinations in Belgium, the Netherlands and Germany. Rotterdam's network carries crude oil, petroleum products, chemicals and industrial gases. Its ARG/RC2 ethylene pipeline network connects the Rotterdam industrial cluster with Antwerp and Germany's Ruhr region.

== Related port groupings ==
The broader grouping that includes the Port of Zeebrugge is known as ZARA. The port companies of Antwerp and Zeebrugge merged in April 2022 to form the Port of Antwerp-Bruges.

The abbreviation ARAG denotes Amsterdam, Rotterdam, Antwerp and Ghent. Since 2018, Ghent, Vlissingen and Terneuzen have formed the cross-border port organisation North Sea Port, which handles both seagoing and inland shipping. The new lock at Terneuzen, opened on 11 October 2024, provides access for larger seagoing vessels to the Ghent–Terneuzen Canal.
