= Arrah (disambiguation) =

Arrah is a city in the Indian state of Bihar. Arrah may also refer to:

== Places ==
- Arrah, Ivory Coast

== Constituencies ==
- Arrah (Vidhan Sabha constituency)
- Arrah (Lok Sabha constituency)

== People ==
- Arrah Lee Gaul (1888-1980), American painter
