= American Radio Association =

The American Radio Association (ARA) is a labour union representing marine radio operators and electronic officers in the United States.

The union's origins lie in the Marine Division of the American Communications Association, which was created in the 1930s and successfully campaigned for the recognition of radio operators as officers. In 1948, the division split away, and sought a merger with the National Marine Engineers' Benefit Association. However, that union rejected the idea, and the division was instead chartered by the Congress of Industrial Organizations (CIO) as the ARA.

The new union soon fell into dispute with the International Organization of Masters, Mates & Pilots over the operation of radiotelephones on ships, but in 1953 achieved agreement that the ARA would have sole jurisdiction over their operators.

In 1955, the union affiliated to the new AFL-CIO, and by 1957, it had 1,600 members. Its membership fell to 1,000 by 1980. In 2006, it merged into the International Longshore and Warehouse Union, but retained its autonomy and affiliation with the AFL-CIO.
