= Ara (lake) =

Lake in Aremark, Norway

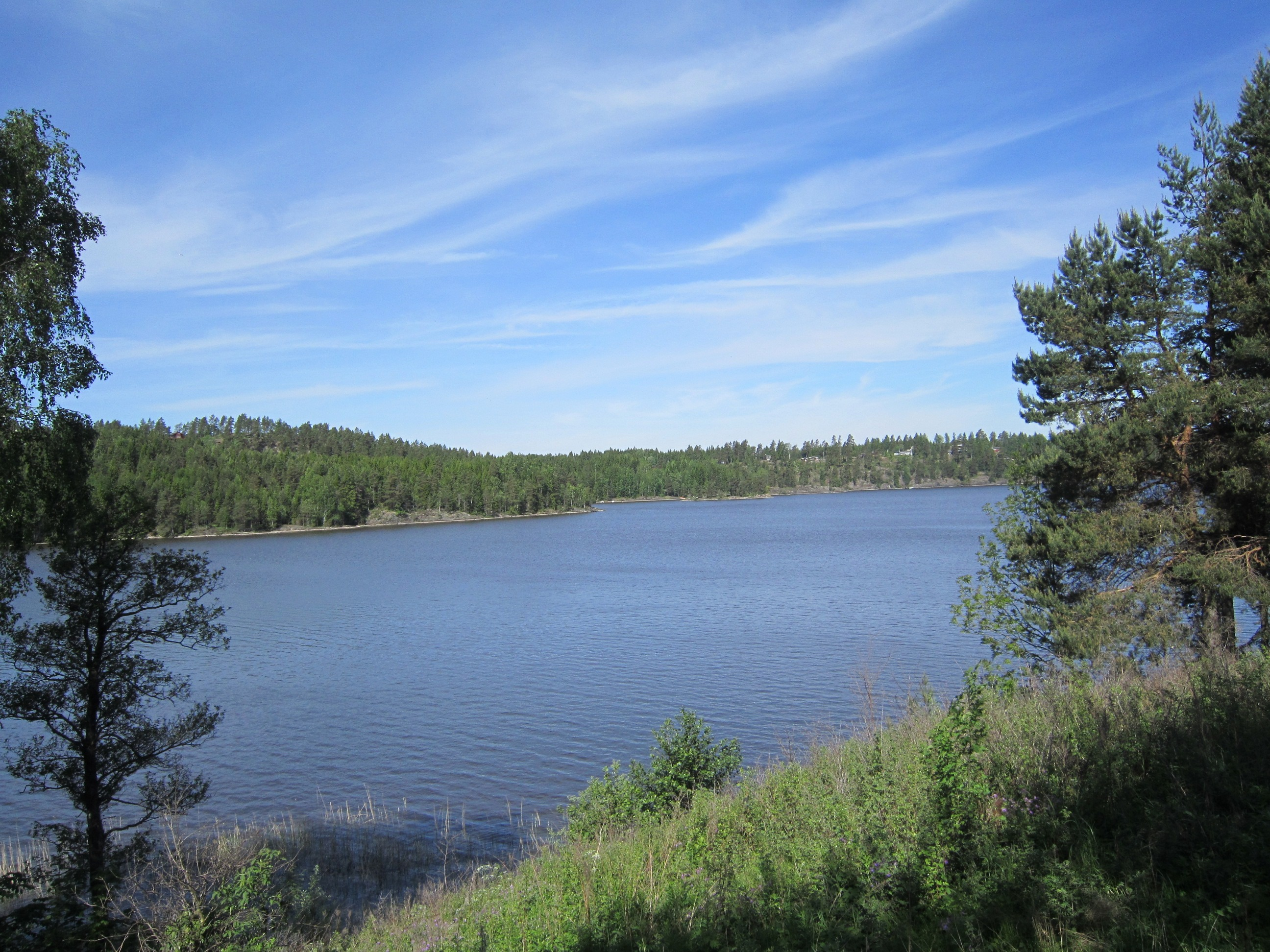

- Location within Norway
- Location: Aremark (Østfold)
- Coordinates: 59°14′14″N 11°40′46″E
- Basin countries: Norway
- Surface area: 7.28 km^{2} (2.81 sq mi)
- Shore length^{1}: 33.65 km (20.91 mi)
- Surface elevation: 105 m (344 ft)
- References: NVE
- ^{1} Shore length is not a well-defined measure.

Ara or Aremarksjøen is a lake in the municipality of Aremark in Østfold county, Norway.

== See also ==
- List of lakes in Norway
