= Ara (ancient Rome) =

Ancient Roman altar

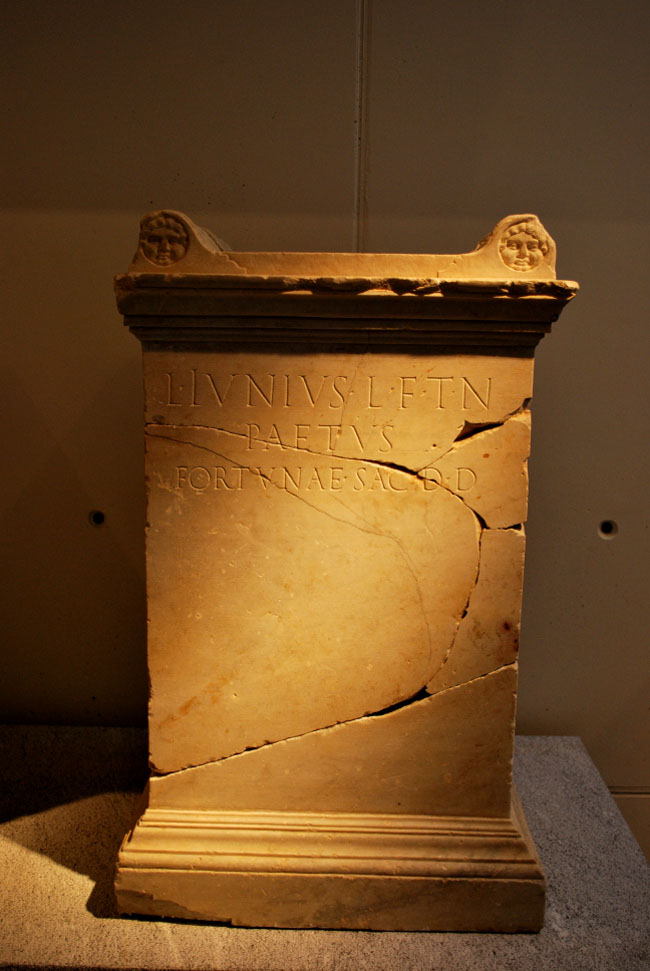
Altar (āra) from Roman Spain

The āra ("altar") was the focal point of sacrifice in ancient Roman religion. Perhaps the best-known Roman altar is the elaborate and Greek-influenced Ara Pacis, which has been called "the most representative work of Augustan art." Other major public altars included the Ara Maxima.

== Types ==
Most altars throughout the city of Rome and in the countryside would have been simple, open-air structures; they may have been located within a sacred precinct (templum), but often without an aedes housing a cult image. According to the classicist John Scheid, the āra was the most important part of a Roman cult site, containing all that was necessary for religious ritual. Until the second century CE, suppliants would burn incense or parts of sacrificed animals at altars in honor of their deities. Prior to the animal sacrifice itself, items such as wine or incense were gathered and burnt upon foculi, which were smaller portable altars. An altar that received food offerings might also be called a mensa, "table."

The Acta of the Arval Brotherhood describe a sacred grove (lucus) dedicated to Dea Dia, wherein—alongside the primary central altar at the cult site—there were "arae temporales" ("temporary altars") that presumably honored subordinate divinities. Given that the text references the same lesser divinities repeatedly, they were likely not interchangeable and therefore not temporary. Thus, thus usage of the term "temporary" possibly does not refer to the gods, but instead to the material used to construct the altars (i.e. they were made of perishable substances). It is not exactly clear what specific substances were used to craft these altars, though one section of the text describes the need to rebuild "temporary" altars that had been destroyed in a fire, perhaps indicating that they consisted of wood. There are other references to altars composed of less durable materials: In the Aeneid, the 1st-century BCE Roman poet Virgil references "aras gramineas," those being "grass altars." Servius, a 4th or 5th-century Roman grammarian, provides additional commentary on this passage, writing that "it had been the Roman custom to put sod on the altar and then sacriﬁce."

=== Arulae ===
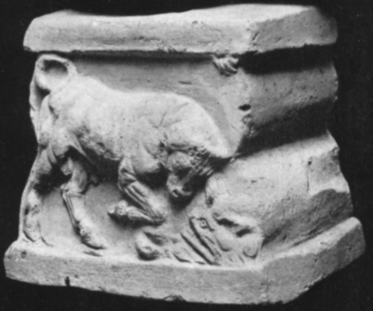
Hourglass-shaped arula depicting a bull charging a serpent

Arulae were small altars that appeared throughout Central Italy and Magna Graecia from the 6th to the 2nd centuries BCE, primarily in sanctuaries or necropolises. The earliest arulae are found in the Greek colonies of Sicily and Southern Italy, whence they spread northwards, reaching areas such as Rome and Capua. Most arulae were fashioned using stepped molding, and they near unilaterally feature a base and crown molding. There was still significant diversity amongst the structure of arulae: Amongst mold-made arulae, for instance, the castings are almost never identical, and only some have a cornice. In terms of dimensions, they range from 8–55 centimetres (3.1–21.7 in) in width and up to 45–50 centimetres (18–20 in) in height. Stylistically, the arulae resembled their larger counterparts, and their design thus varied across regions in accordance with the artistic diversity of monumental altars themselves. At Largo Argentina, for instance, both the arulae and the monumental altars feature stepped molding articulated in a cyma reversa style and they both largely lack any decoration or adornment. The significance of arulae was probably largely symbolic: They served as representations of standard altars, perhaps allowing suppliants to effectively partake in otherwise inaccessible rituals.

== History ==
The term āra etymologically connects to Hittite ḫaššaš ("hearth, fireplace"), both of which ultimately reflect Proto-Indo-European *h₂éHsh₂. Hearths and fire both remained significant throughout numerous Indo-European religions, such as those of the Ancient Greeks and Hittites. In Roman literature, altars are sometimes associated with fire: Virgil, a 1st-century BCE Roman poet, for instance, writes "the altars light up with fires" ("adolescunt ignibus arae"). In the Acts of the Arval Brethren, a ritual sacrifice is described which occurs in luco ("in a sacred grove") and also at an āra. The philologist Gregory Nagy compares this ritual to a ceremony from the Iguvine tablets, wherein "fire" ("pir") is placed upon the "altar" ("ase") which is located in a "sacred grove" ("vuke"). Other sections from the Iguvine tablets also associate fire with altars, such as the phrase "pir ase antentu," meaning "he shall place the fire on the altar." In the Oscan Agnone tablet, the term purasiaí ("fiery") is sometimes used as a descriptive adjective for the word aasaí, which is cognate with the aforementioned Latin term for altar. According to a translation by the philologist Larissa Bonfante, the text describes the offering of "holy burnt" items at these altars.

Within Roman ritual language, the ārae appeared in tandem with the foci, themselves a type of a fireplace. Servius, a 5th-century CE Roman grammarian, writes—citing the 1st-century BCE author Varro—alongside the "ārae that are consecrated, focī too are regularly consecrated" and that "it is not allowed to perform public or private sacrifices without a focus." Such sacrifices performed utilizing foci and fire are attested in the Acts of the Arval Brethren, where it is recorded that the promagister of the brotherhood "made a sacrifice with incense and wine on the fire, on the foculus." According to Nagy, the āra represented a type of stationary fireplace, whereas the focī were movable. Nagy cites the writings of Ovid, a 1st-century BCE poet, who provides instructions for a ritual wherein the suppliant is commanded to "add prayers and the appropriate words at the focī that are set down ("positīs")." This passage makes use of an inflected form of the verb pōnō ("to place, put") to describe the action of setting down the focī, thereby explicitly conveying a literal placement of the fire.

The focī are perhaps semantically equivalent to Umbrian ahtim, which itself possibly denotes a type of movable brazier used in religious ritual. Moreover, Nagy suggests that the Umbrian phrase ahtisper ("for the ahti-") is comparable to the Latin phrase "pro aris focisque" ("for the ārae and the focī"). Etymologically, the Umbrian word ahtim might connect to Latin āctiō ("action, doing"), in which case the word may have originally signified a type of ritual action or activation. If this theory is accepted, then it perhaps serves a partial semantic parallel for pūrgō ("to purge, cleanse"), which Nagy derives from *pūrigō, a combination of a base *pūr and the suffix -igō. Nagy argues that the putative verb *pūrigō would—according to its etymological components—have literally meant something such as "to do or activate fire," wherein the ceremonial action performed upon the flames corresponds to the same "activation" initially denoted by the term ahtim.
