= AppleTalk Remote Access =

Protocol stack by Apple

AppleTalk Remote Access (ARA) was a protocol stack that allowed AppleTalk to be run over modems. It became a fairly major product for Apple Computer in the early to mid-1990s when their first portable and laptop computers were available (and very popular). ARA slowly disappeared in the late 1990s when TCP/IP took over the vast majority of networking needs, notably remote access.

Most networking protocols have strong "layering" that separates the various jobs inside the protocol into different pieces of software. This allows them to be run on top of any hardware by replacing the lowest level of the "stack", the hardware drivers. For instance, IP can be made to run on a variety of Ethernet cards or even Token Ring with little effort. For slower speeds, like on modems, things become somewhat more difficult, as the protocols often have invisible assumptions about timing and performance that make it inefficient on links with very limited bandwidth.

AppleTalk included several protocols that made this even more difficult. In particular, AppleTalk had several internal tasks for discovery and naming that ran all the time and made the protocol "chatty". This added to the bandwidth problems, making it even less efficient in this case.

Thus ARA was considerably more complex than similar solutions for IP, replacing many parts of the AppleTalk stack and seriously modifying others. As a result, ARA was quite large, larger than the basic AppleTalk stack, and somewhat memory hungry. It was also slow, a problem it shared with IP at similar speeds. Nevertheless, ARA was the only protocol available for remote access on the Mac, and also shared the typical Apple properties of being easy to install, set up and run. It became a fairly profitable product on its own, and was sold widely in stores.

The introduction of SLIP and the increased use of IP on the Macintosh led to some infighting within Apple as the profits from ARA were reduced. This led Apple to place their IP remote access software in ARA as well, although this had the side effect of making various freeware implementations much more popular. As support for TCP/IP was added, the product line became known as Apple Remote Access. Later versions supported AppleTalk connections over ARAP and TCP/IP connections over PPP.

ARA remained important, if somewhat less so, product for Apple into the late 1990s. In Mac OS X it is no longer required, as Apple has migrated the vast majority of its networking software to IP, and includes remote access software for free.
