= Arakawa River =

Arakawa River (荒川) or Ara River may refer to:

- Arakawa River (Kanto), which flows from Saitama Prefecture and through Tokyo to Tokyo Bay
- Arakawa River (Uetsu), which flows from Yamagata Prefecture and through Niigata Prefecture to the Sea of Japan.
- Arakawa River (Fukushima), which starts and finishes in Fukushima City, Fukushima
