= Port of Amsterdam =

- Interactive map of Port of Amsterdam

Location
- Country: Netherlands
- Location: Amsterdam, North Holland
- Coordinates: 52.4120°N 4.8079°E
- UN/LOCODE: NLAMS

Details
- Opened: 13th century
- Operated by: NV Haven Amsterdam
- Owned by: Amsterdam
- Size of harbour: 620 ha (1,500 acres)
- Land area: 1,995 ha (4,930 acres)
- Employees: 60,000 (2015)
- President & CEO: Koen Overtoom

Statistics
- Vessel arrivals: ▼8,567 sea ships (2014)
- Annual cargo tonnage: ▼63 million tons (2023)
- Annual container volume: ▼45.376 TEU (2014)
- Passenger traffic: ▲304,149 by sea (2011) ▲315,589 by river (2014)
- Annual revenue: ▲€133.0 million (2011)
- Net income: ▲€42.6 million (2011)
- Website www.portofamsterdam.com

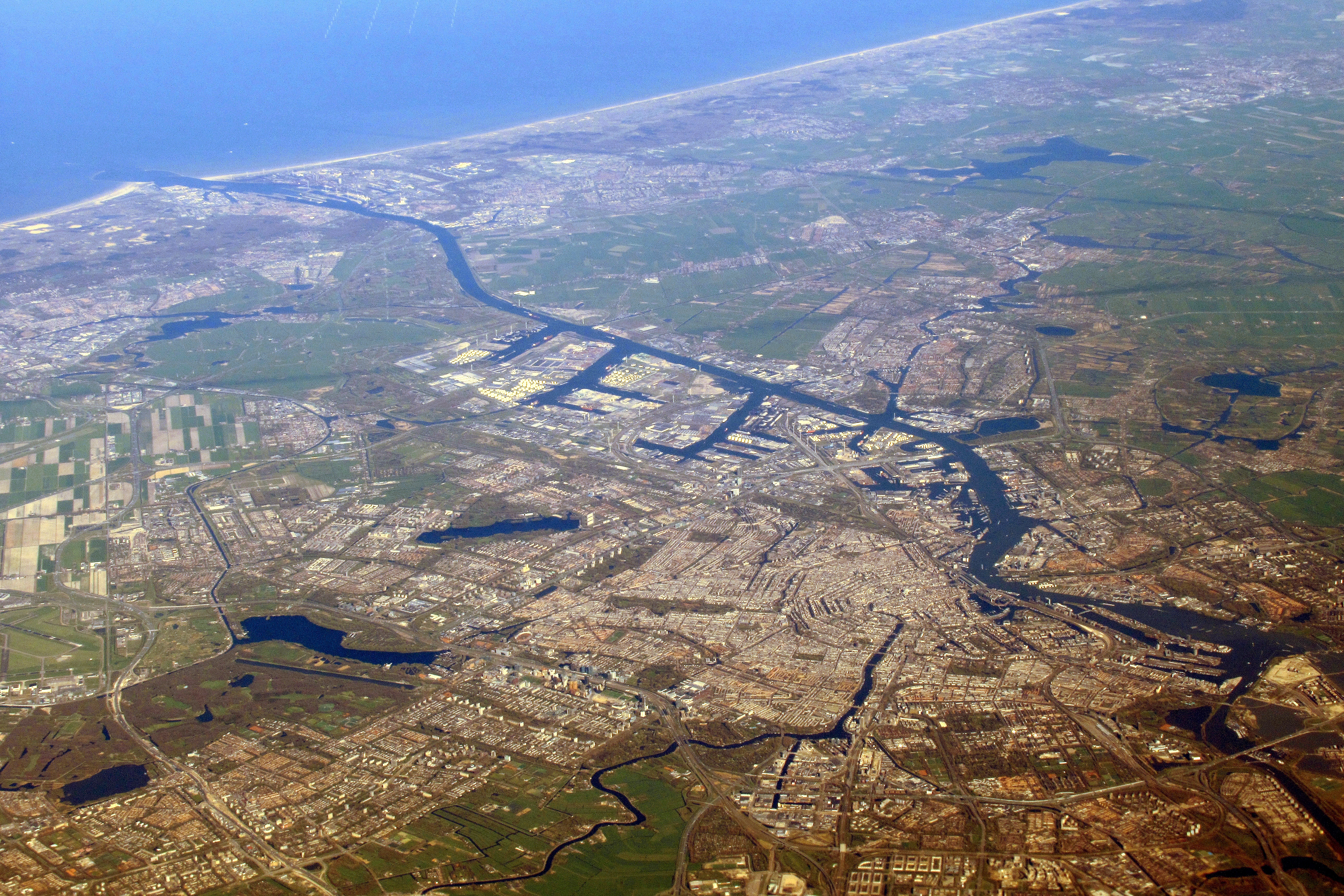
Aerial view of Amsterdam and its port

The port of Amsterdam (Dutch: Haven van Amsterdam) is an inland seaport in Amsterdam in North Holland, Netherlands. It is the 14th busiest port in Europe by total cargo tonnage. In 2023, the port of Amsterdam had a cargo throughput of 63 million tons.

The port is located on the bank of a former bay named the IJ and the North Sea Canal, with which it is connected to the North Sea. The port was first used in the 13th century and was one of the main ports of the Dutch East India Company in the 17th century. Today, the port of Amsterdam is the second largest port in the Netherlands, after the Port of Rotterdam.

== History ==
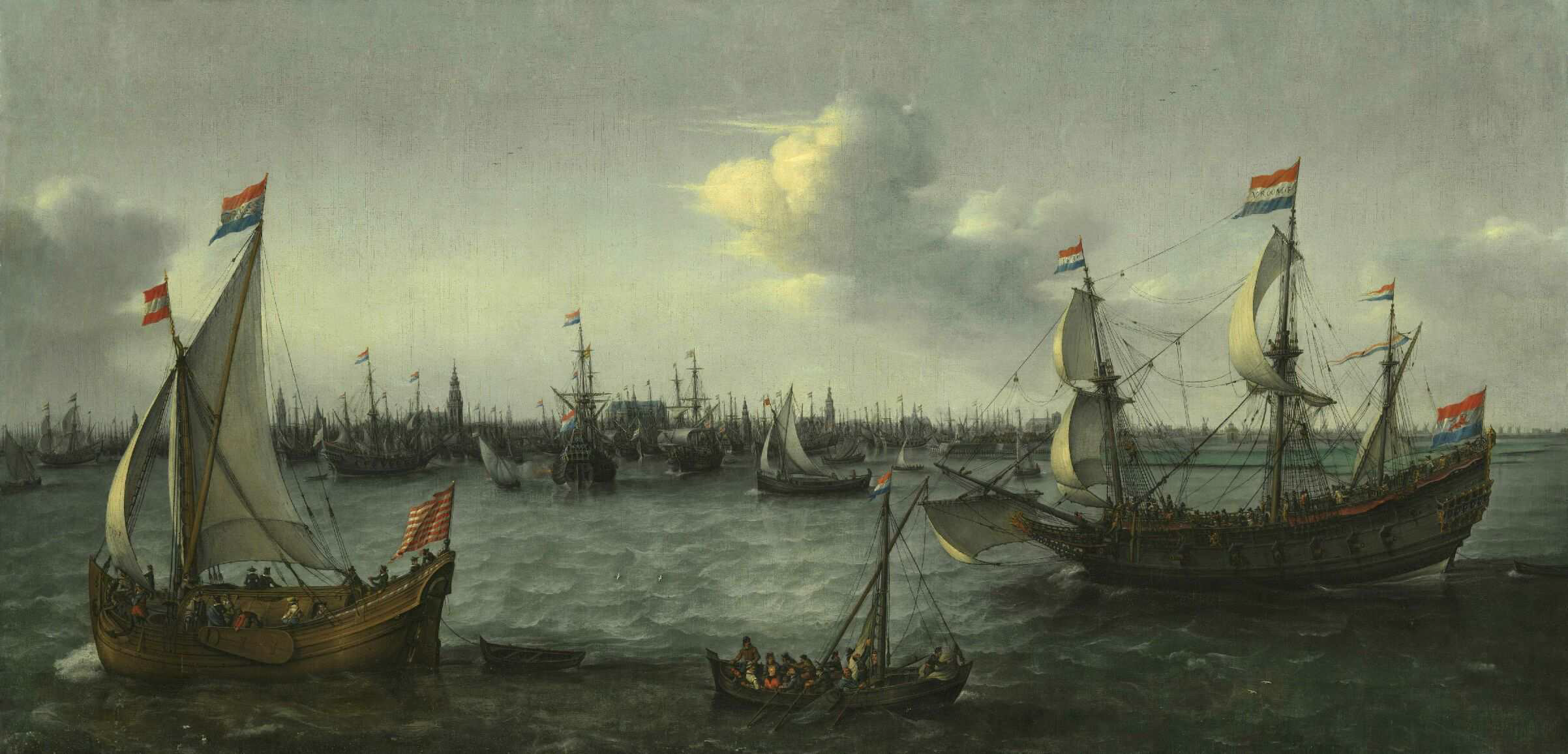
The Harbour in Amsterdam (1630) by Hendrick Cornelisz Vroom

The first port activities in Amsterdam date back to the 13th century. The port was first mentioned in the year 1342, when the city of Amsterdam received city rights.

In the Dutch Golden Age the port was one of the main harbours of the Dutch East India Company.

The North Holland Canal, that connects Amsterdam to Den Helder was dug between 1819 and 1824. The North Sea Canal, that connects Amsterdam to IJmuiden, was dug between 1865 and 1876.

== Geography ==
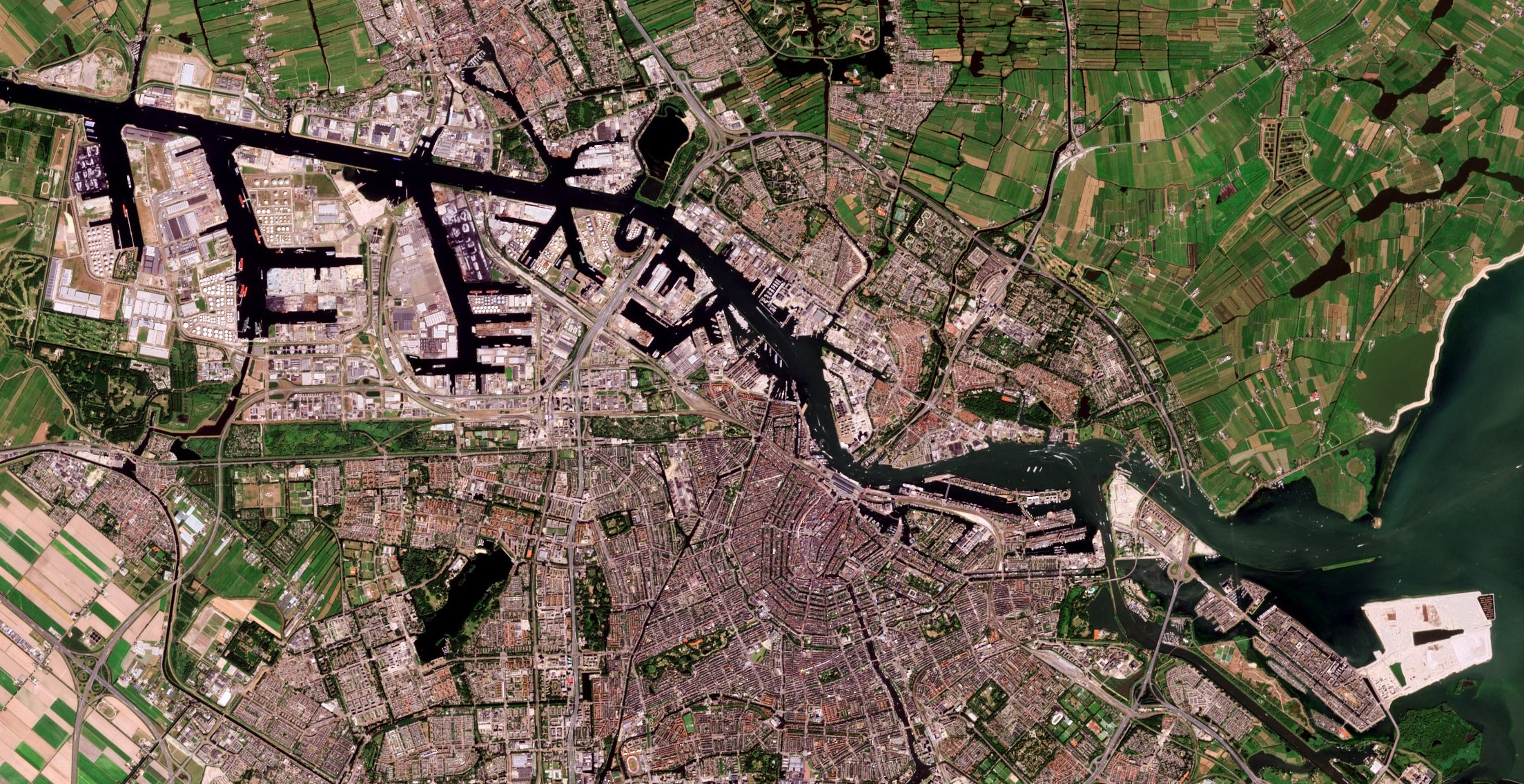
A satellite photo of the port of Amsterdam

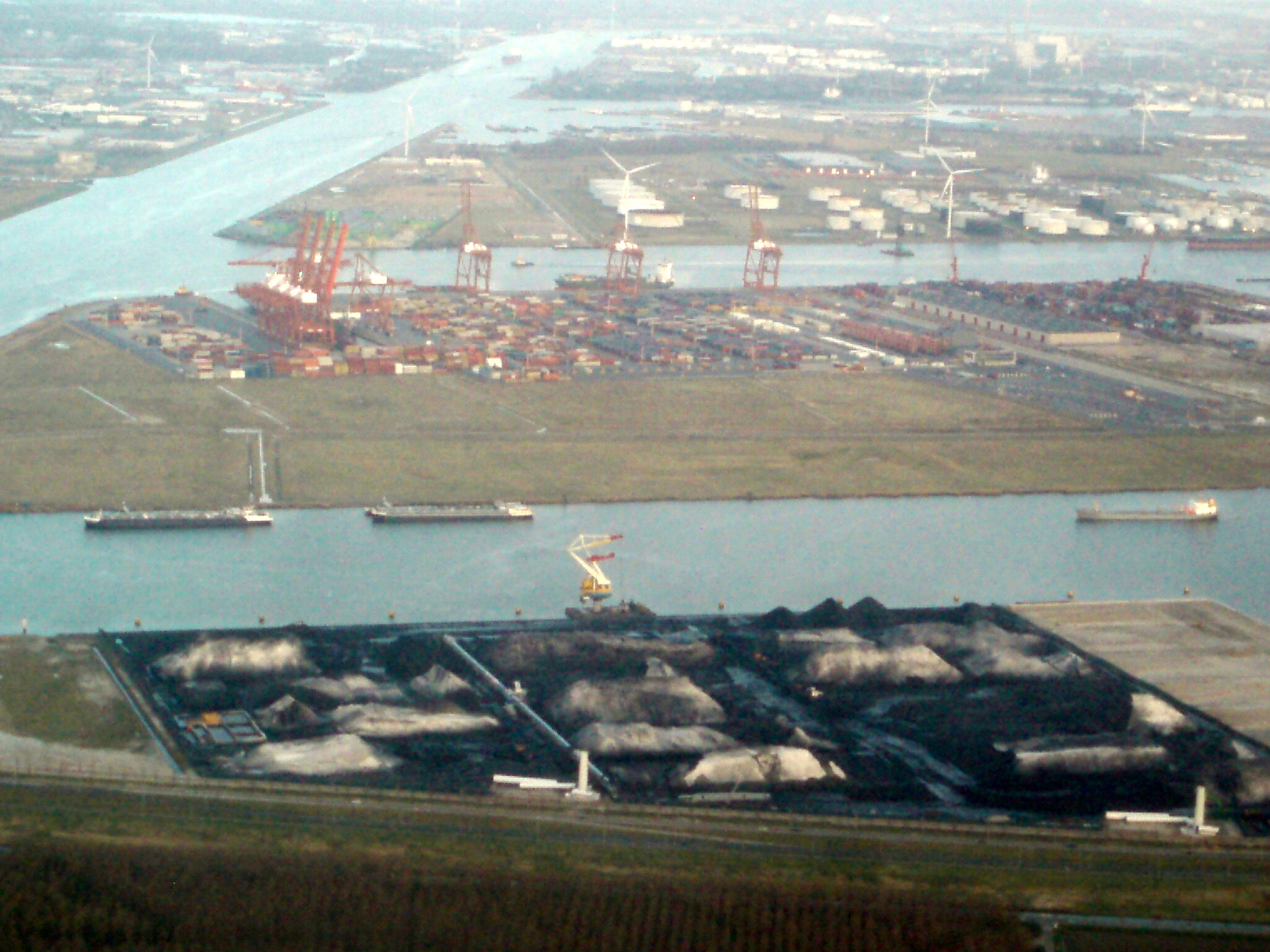
North Sea Canal, Afrikahaven, Amerikahaven and Westhaven

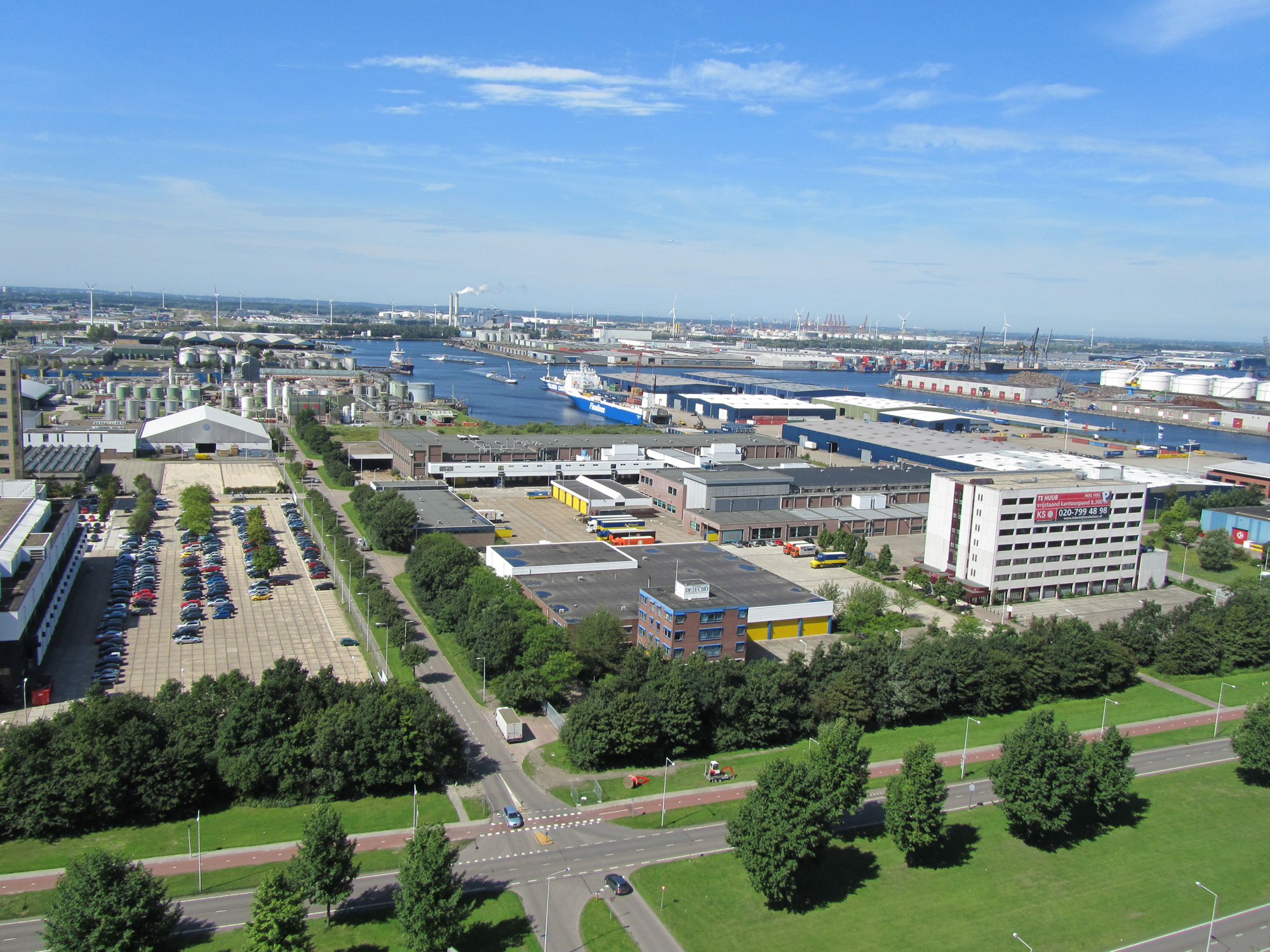
Westhaven

The port of Amsterdam is located on the banks of the North Sea Canal and the IJ. The port is connected to the North Sea through the North Sea Canal, to Den Helder through the North Holland Canal, to the Markermeer through the IJ and the IJmeer, and to the Rhine through the Amsterdam-Rhine Canal.

In total, the port comprises 620 ha (1,500 acres) of waterways and 1,995 ha (4,930 acres) of land area, including port estates, quays, roads, railway tracks, ditches and green space.

The port comprises several harbour areas, which are part of the boroughs (Dutch: stadsdelen) of Westpoort, Westerpark, Centrum, and Zeeburg. From west to east the areas are:

- Afrika Harbour (Dutch: Afrikahaven)
- Amerika Harbour (Dutch: Amerikahaven)
- West Harbour (Dutch: Westhaven)
- Jan van Riebeeck Harbour (Dutch: Jan van Riebeeckhaven)
- Petroleum Harbour (Dutch: Petroleumhaven)
- Coen Harbour (Dutch: Coenhaven)
- Mercurius Harbour (Dutch: Mercuriushaven)
- Hout Harbour (Dutch: Houthaven)
- De Ruijter Quay (Dutch: De Ruijterkade)
- Eastern Trade Quay (Dutch: Oostelijke Handelskade)
- Eastern Harbour Area (Dutch: Oostelijk Havengebied)

== Business operations ==
In terms of cargo throughput, the port of Amsterdam is the second largest port of the Netherlands after the port of Rotterdam.

In 2008, 6,029 sea vessels visited the port of Amsterdam, with a cargo throughput of 75.8 million tons, most of which was bulk cargo. That same year, the total container volume was 435,129 TEU. Both the number of vessels and the bulk cargo and container throughput increased compared to 2007.

In 2008, the total revenue was € 125.3 million and the net income € 45.0 million. This is a minor decrease compared to the revenue and income in 2007.

In 2008, the port itself had 361 employees, but the number of indirect employees is circa 55,000. On 7 July 2009, Mrs. Dertje Meijer was appointed as the director of the port by the government of Amsterdam.

In 2014, the port of Amsterdam had a cargo throughput of 97.4 million tons, most of which was bulk cargo.

In 2023, the revenue increased to €190.4 million, but transhipment decreased to 63 million tons due to a decline in fossil fuel transhipment. This was a 20% transhipment decline compared to 2022. Transhipment of coal fell by 48% to 7.4 tons. The Port of Amsterdam transitions to more non-fossil activities. Contract revenue in 2023 rose to €115.6 million from €103.6 million in the previous year.

=== Cruise port ===
The Port of Amsterdam is the 3rd biggest cruise port in Europe with 140 sea cruise ships and 1500 river cruise ships. Almost 700,000 cruise passengers per year visit Amsterdam. There are two cruise terminals: the Passenger Terminal Amsterdam in the city center, and one after the locks in IJmuiden. In 2015 Amsterdam won the prize for International Cruise Port of the Year.

Amsterdam is homeport for the Koningsdam, the new ship from Holland America Line. In September 2015, the MSC Splendida visited Amsterdam; at 333.33 meters long and 38 meters wide, it was the biggest cruise ship ever in Amsterdam.

=== Havenmeester ===
The CEOs of the Port of Amsterdam have the title havenmeester (harbor master). Since the Dutch Golden Age (16th century), the Havenmeester of Amsterdam was based in the Schreierstoren at the Prins Hendrikkade 94. In 1960, the head office moved to the new Havengebouw on De Ruijterkade. Since 2016, the havenmeester is Koen Overtoom.

== Sustainability ==
The Port of Amsterdam aims to be at the top of Europe's sustainable ports by 2030. The Port divides their sustainability vision into five themes: Energy transition in a circular economy, Environment and habitat, Clean and safe shipping, Work and credentials, and responsible trade chains.

== International cooperation ==
The port of Amsterdam has a connection with the ports of the following cities:

- Port of Accra, Ghana
- Port of Beijing, China
- Port of Cape Town, South Africa
- Port of Halifax, Canada (Until 2019)
- (Ivory Coast) Port of San Pédro, Côte d'Ivoire
- Port of Tianjin, China
- Port of Xiamen, China
- Gwangyang Bay Free Economic Zone, South Korea (2018)

== Gallery ==
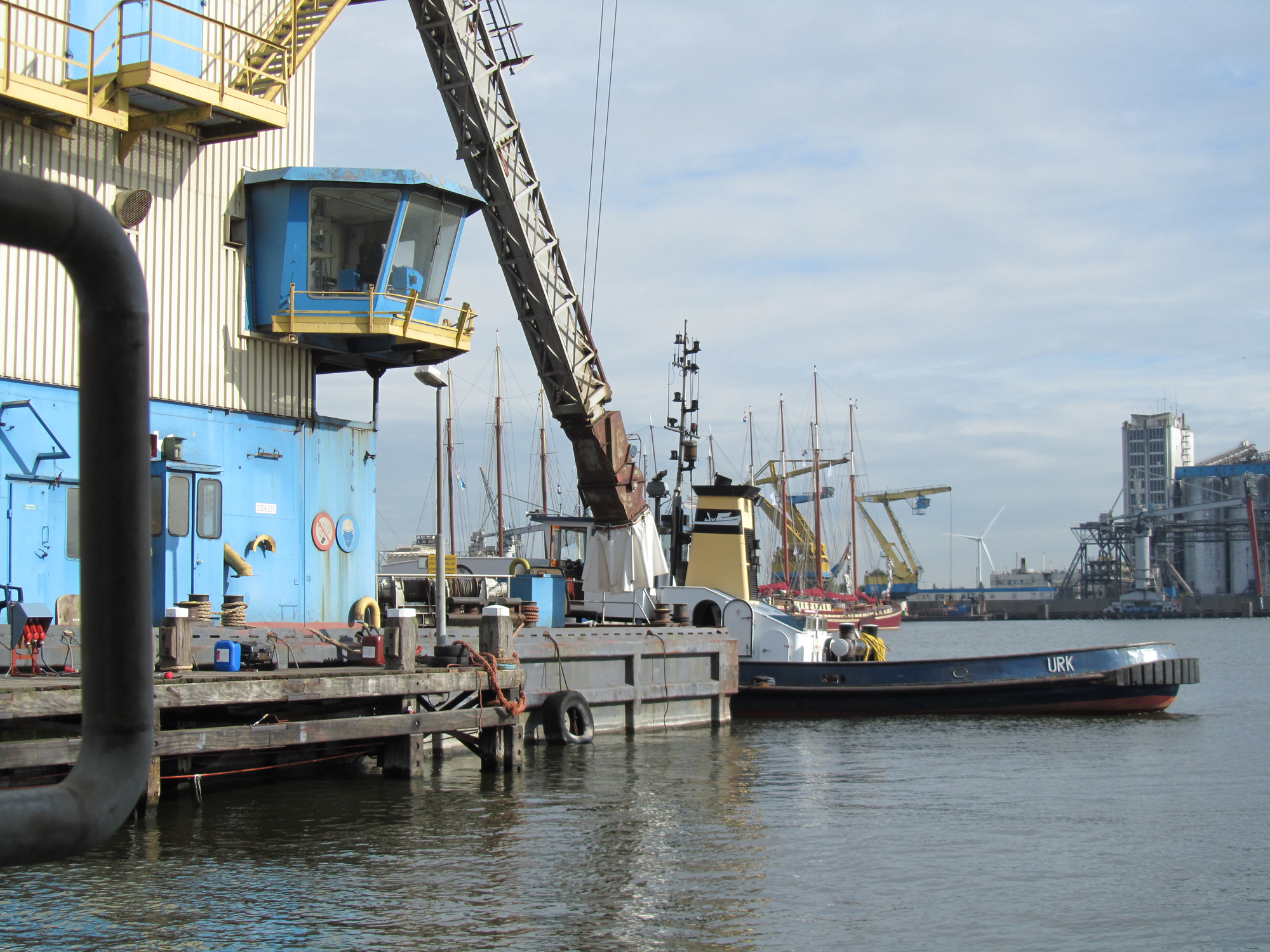
Neptunushaven

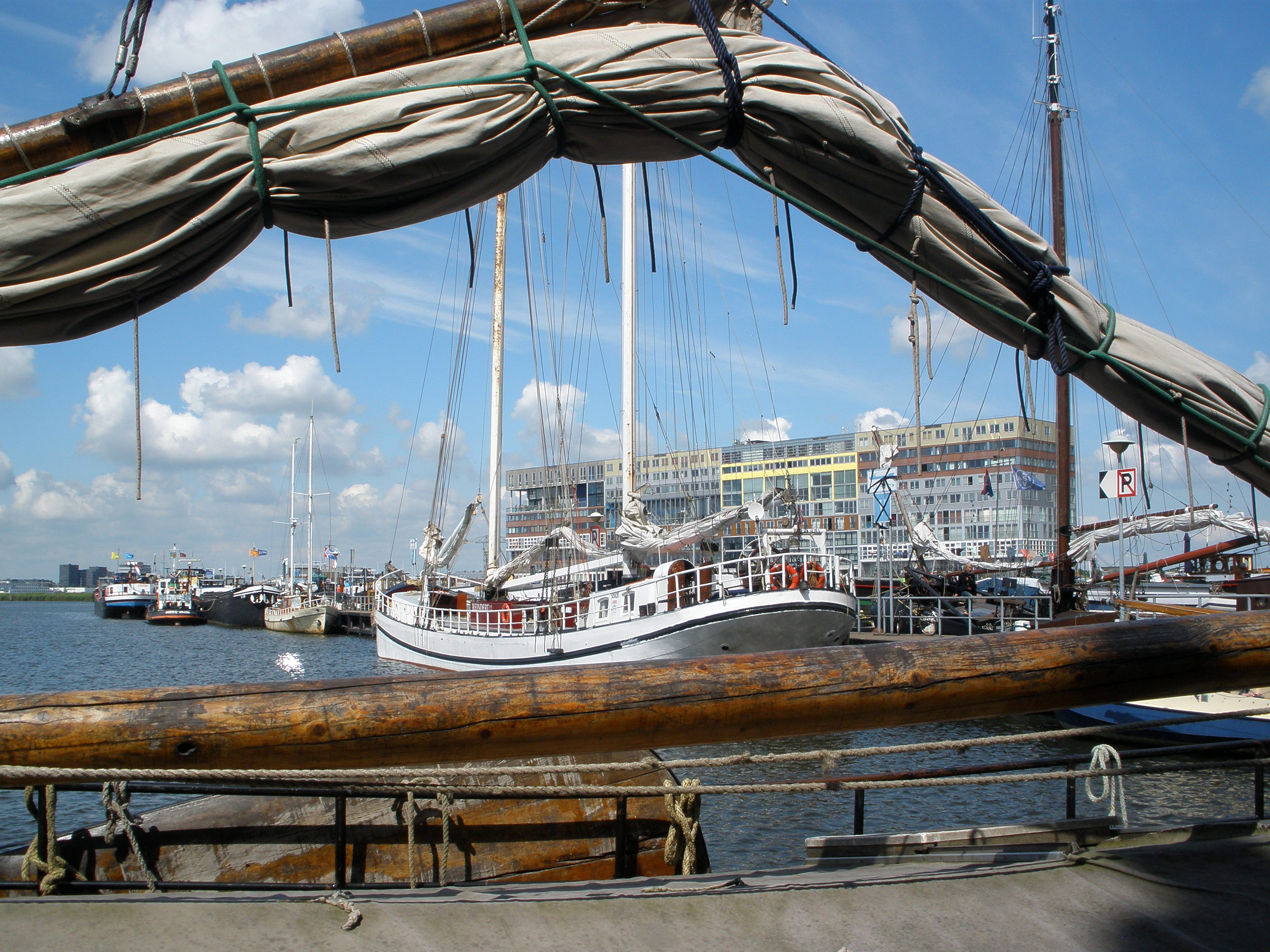
Houthaven

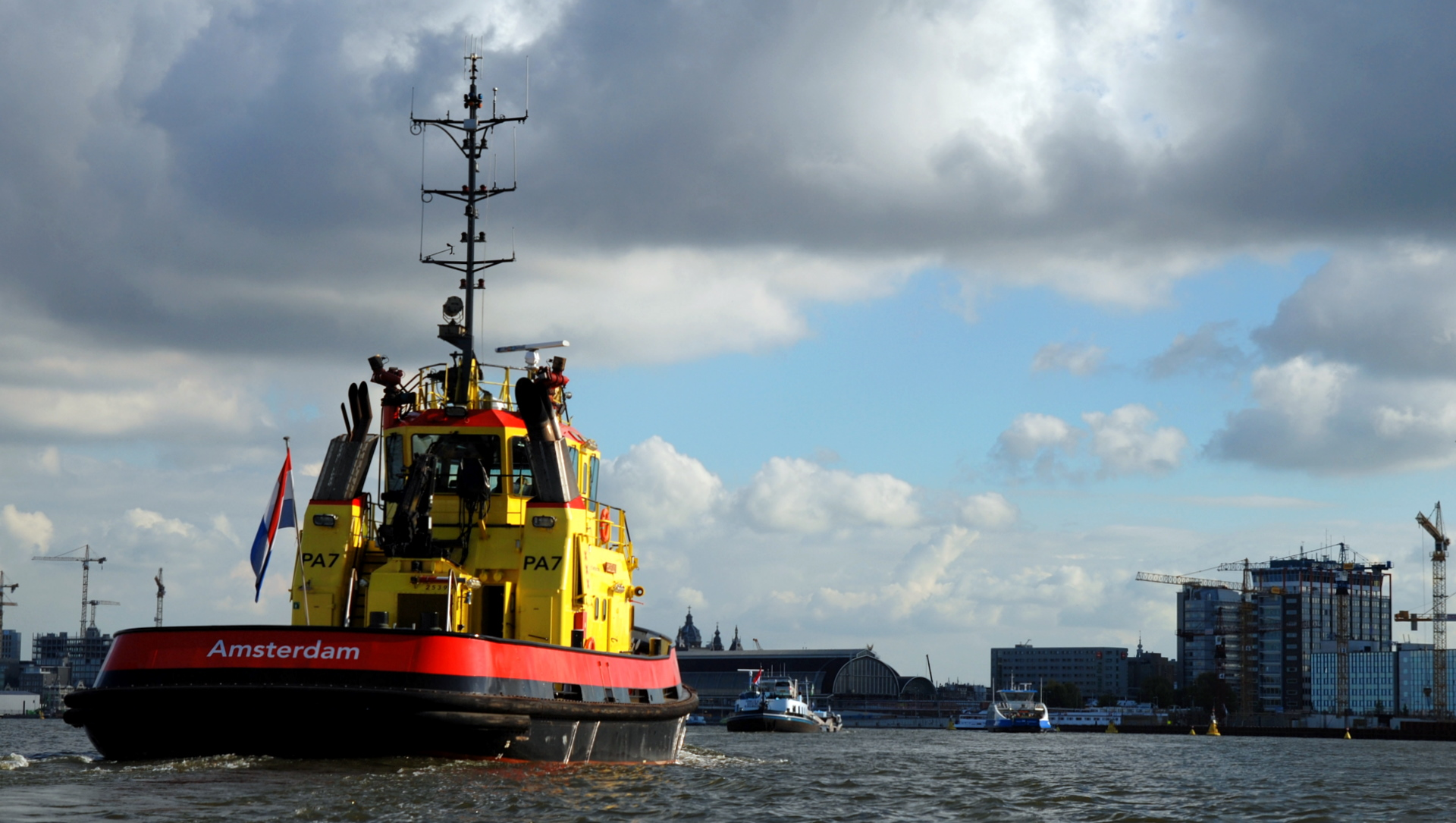
The Poseidon, tugboat at the port

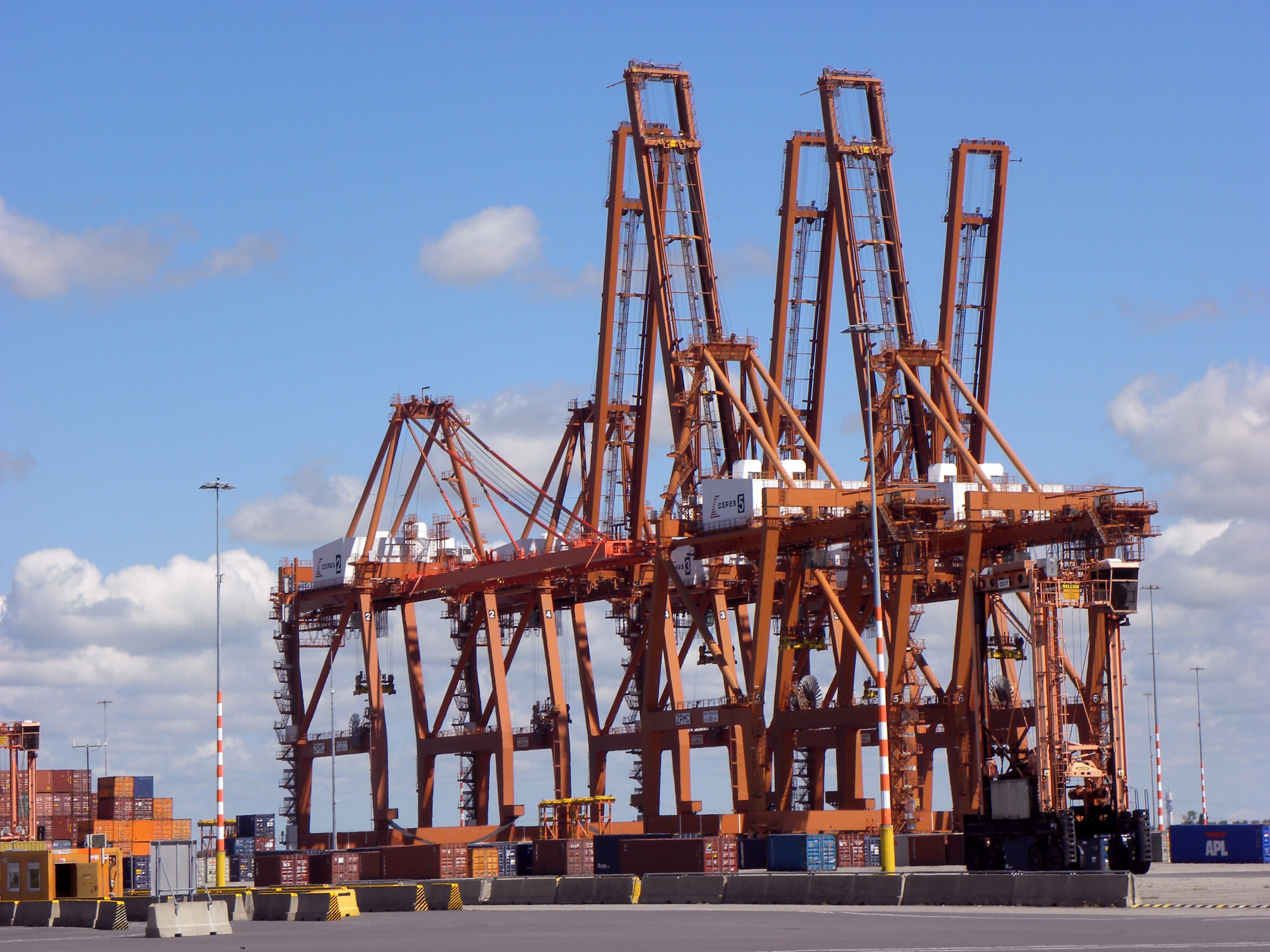
Alaskahaven (containers)

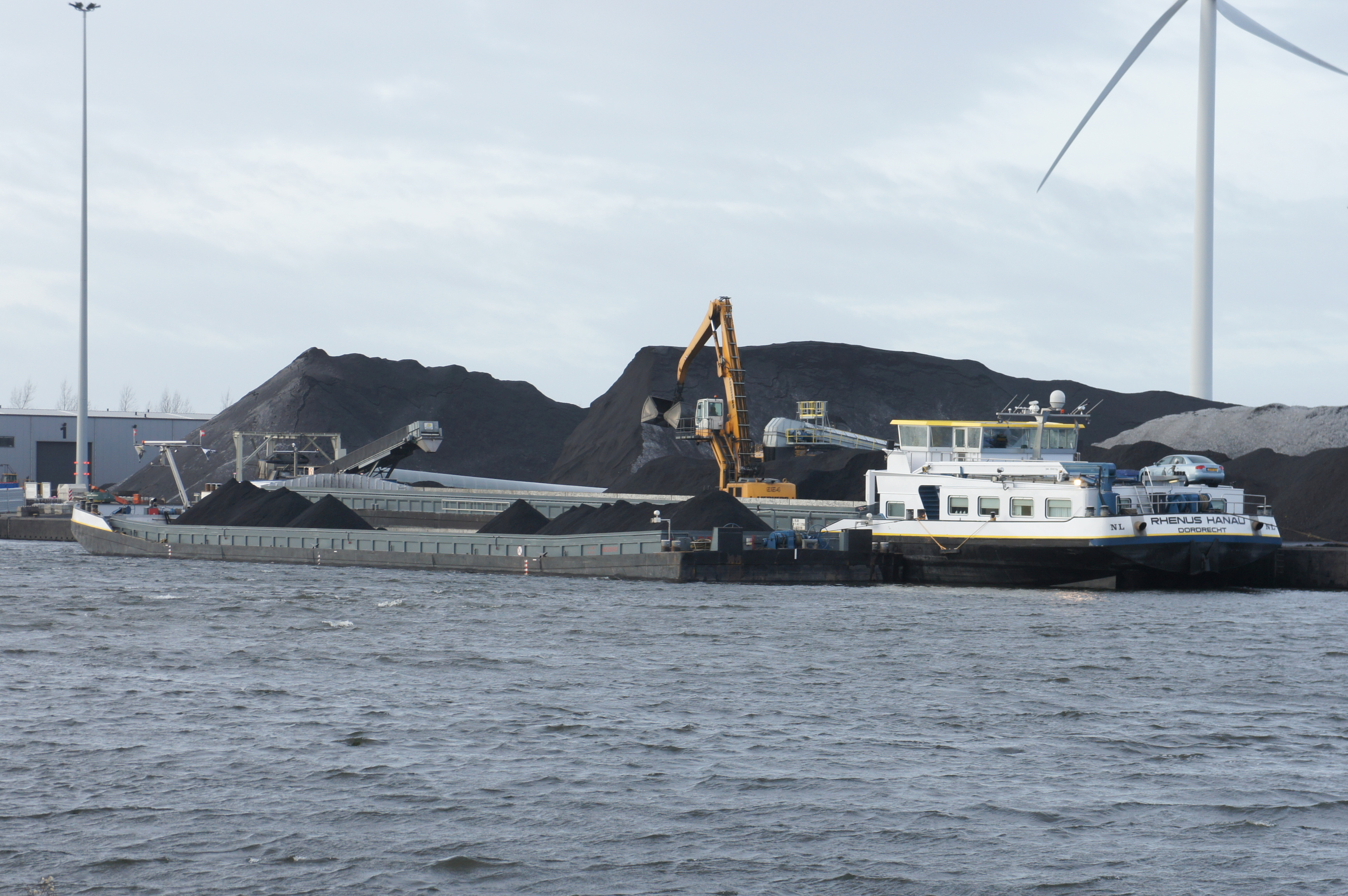
Zanzibarhaven

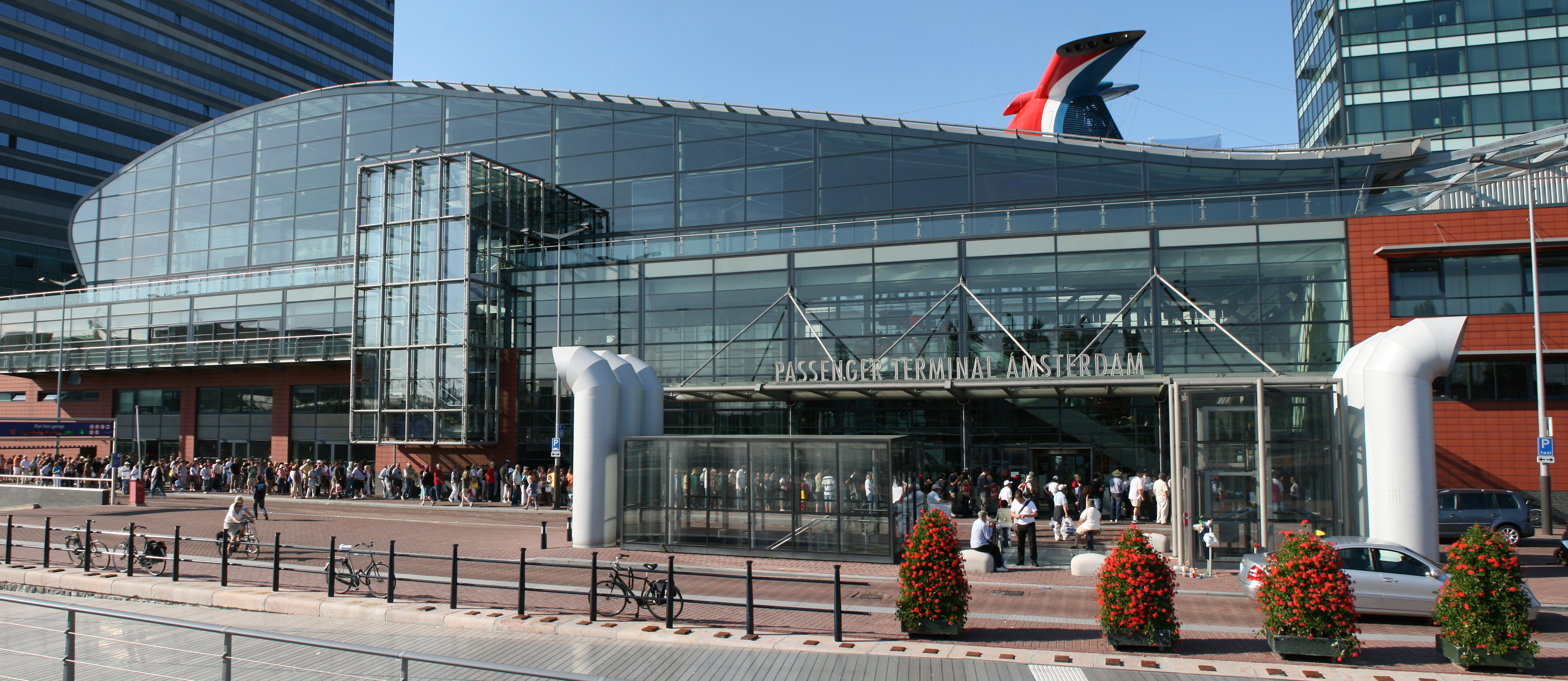
Passengers terminal

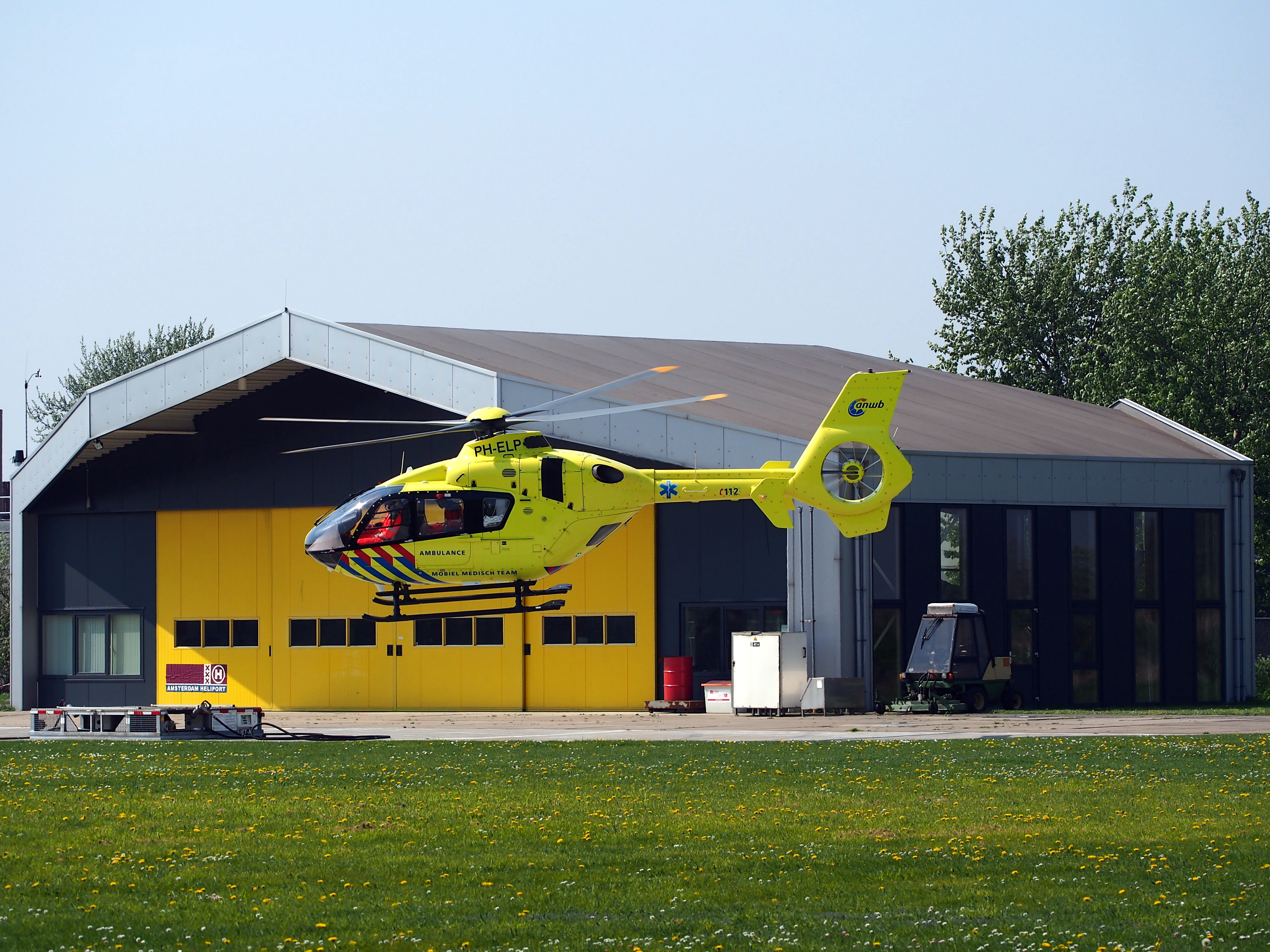
Heliport in the port
