= Disposable food packaging =

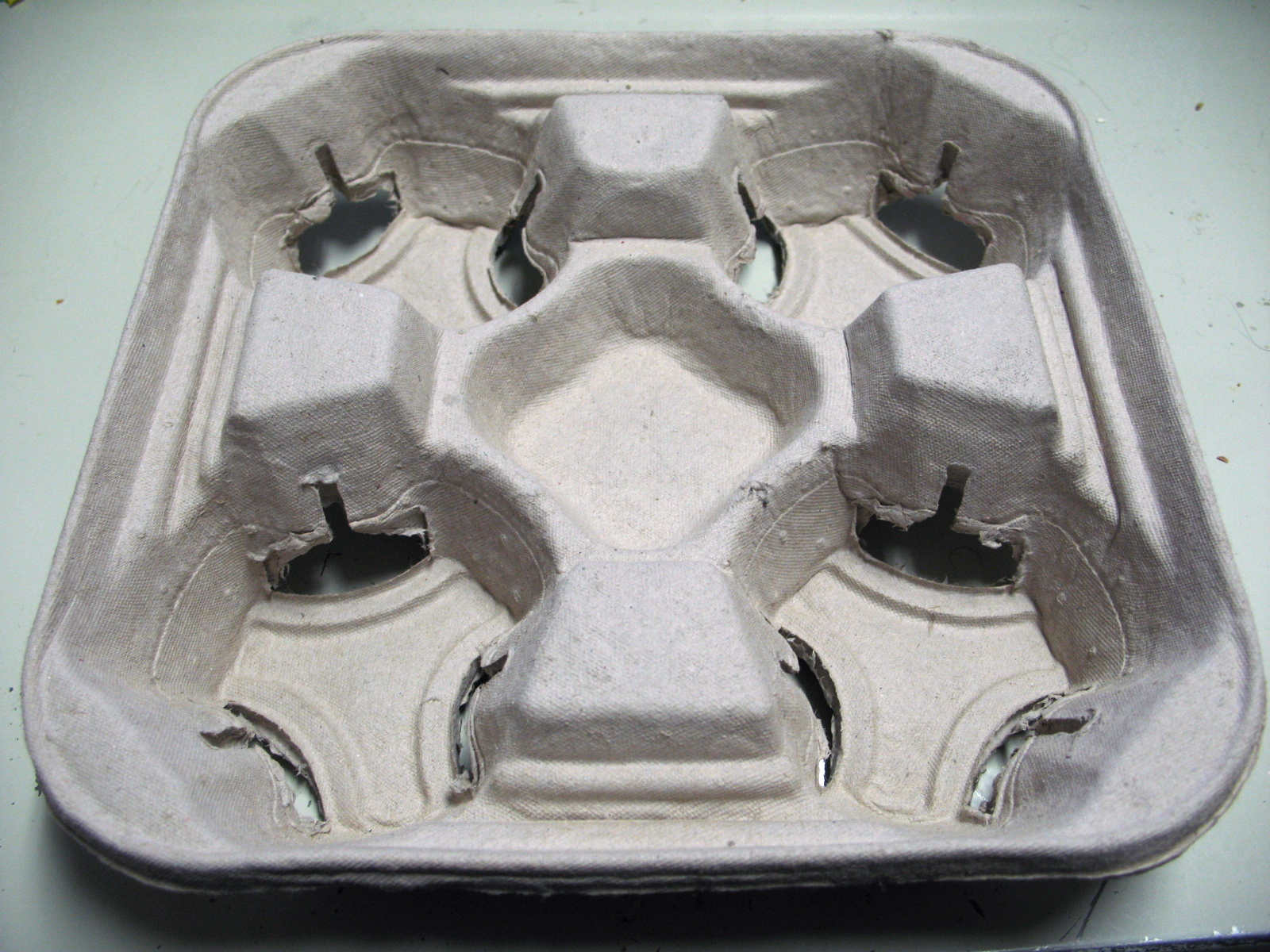
Molded pulp drink carrier

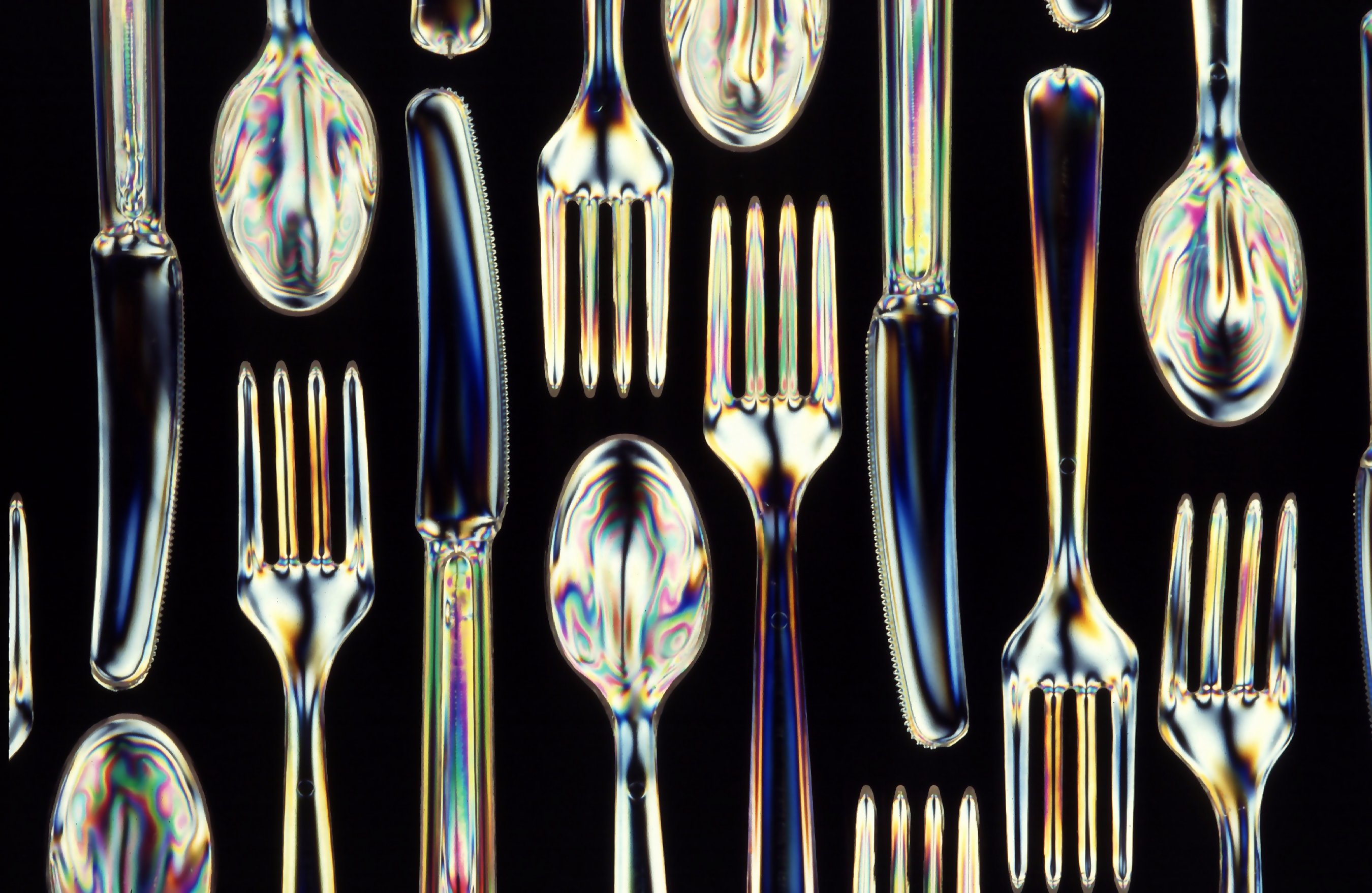
Biodegradable plastic utensils

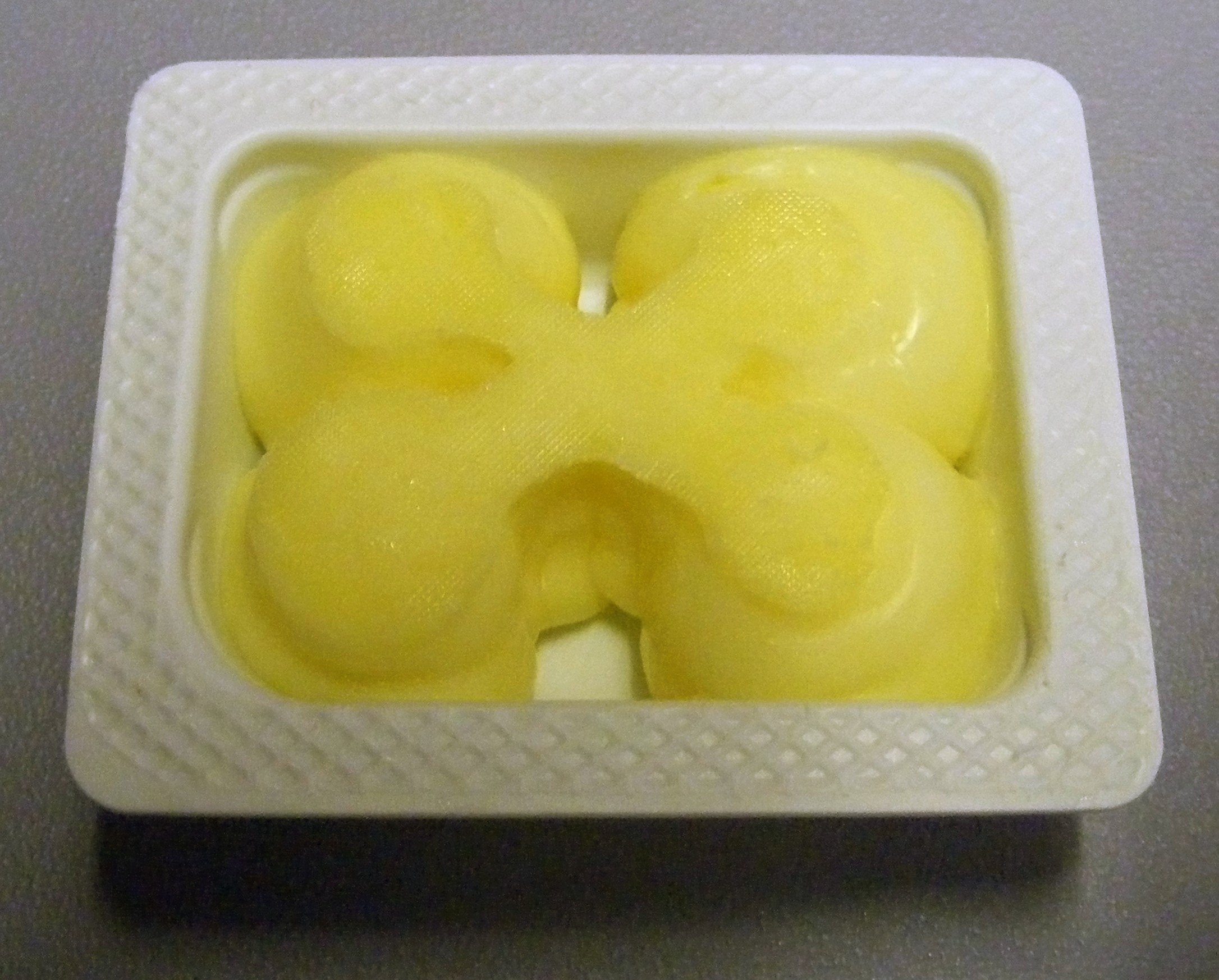
A single-serving packet of butter

Disposable food packaging comprises disposable products often found in fast-food restaurants, take-out restaurants and catering establishments. Typical products are foam food containers, plates, bowls, cups, utensils, doilies and tray papers. These products can be made from a number of materials including plastics, paper, bioresins, wood and bamboo.

Packaging of fast food and take-out food involves a significant amount of material that ends up in landfill, recycling, composting or litter.

== History ==
The paper plate was invented by the German bookbinder Hermann Henschel in Luckenwalde in 1867.

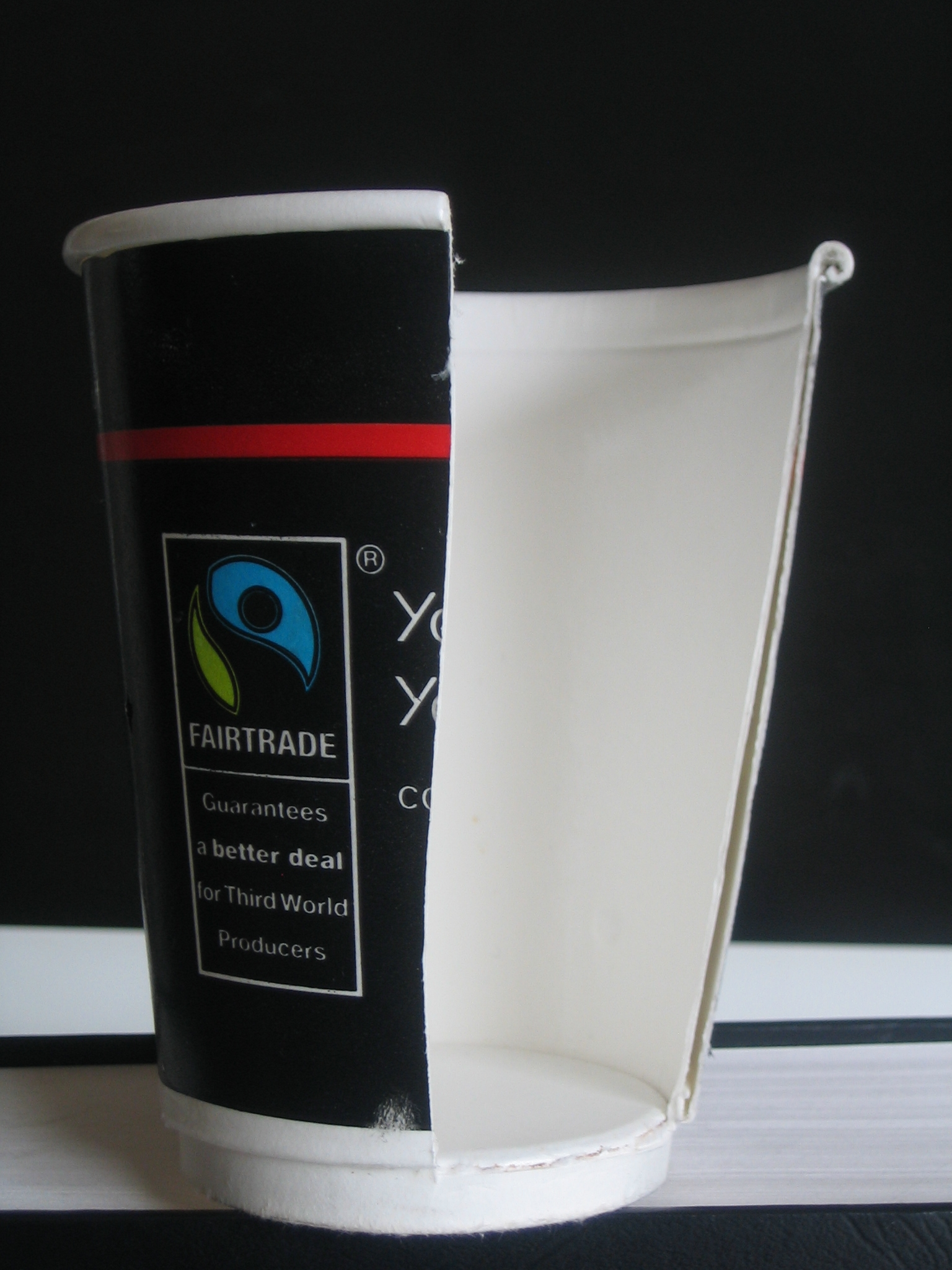
Insulated paper cup for hot drinks, cut away to show air layer

In 1908, Samuel J. Crumbine was a public health officer in Kansas. He was on a train when he witnessed one of his tuberculosis patients taking a drink of water from a common dipper and water bucket (a publicly shared way of drinking water) in the car. Right behind his patient was a young girl who drank from the same dipper and bucket. This inspired him to launch a crusade to ban publicly shared or common utensils in public places. Taking note of the trend, Lawrence Luellen and Hugh Moore invented a disposable paper cup called the "Health Cup" and later renamed the "Dixie Cup".

Single-use cone cups were followed by the commercialization of single-use plates and bowls, wooden cutlery, and paper food wraps. By the 1930s these products were widely used to feed the men and women who worked on the remote dams, bridges and roads of the Works Progress Administration. In the 1940s they were used to feed defense factory workers.

After World War II, foodservice packaging materials like plastic and polystyrene foam were developed. The unique properties of these materials (insulation and weight reduction) and their ability to be made into a variety of shapes and sizes, provided foodservice operators, and consumers, with a wider variety of packaging choices.

A major development in disposable foodservice packaging happened in 1948 when the newly founded McDonald's restaurant closed to revamp its menu. Along with changing their menu items, the restaurant wanted to change the way it handled dishwashing and dishwashers, car hops and wait staff, and storage, breakage and (customer) theft of tableware. When the McDonald's re-opened six months later, its meals were no longer served with the use of glasses, plates or cutlery, and were taken away from the restaurant by the customers.

== Sanitation ==
The use of disposable foodservice packaging is a step toward preventing foodborne disease. By being used only once, these products help reduce food contamination and the spread of diseases.

The U.S. Food and Drug Administration’s Food Code authoritatively spells out the sanitary and health advantages of single-use foodservice packaging in specific situations: "A food establishment without facilities...for cleaning and sanitizing kitchenware and tableware shall provide only single-use kitchenware, single-service articles, and single-use articles for use by food employees and single-service articles for use by consumers." The Food Code further states "in situations in which the reuse of multiuse items could result in foodborne illness to consumers, single-service and single-use articles must be used to ensure safety."

== Materials ==
Disposable foodservice packaging can be made from a number of materials, each with its own uses and benefits.

=== Aluminum ===
Aluminum is used to manufacture foils, wraps, bags, containers, and trays.

=== Plastics ===
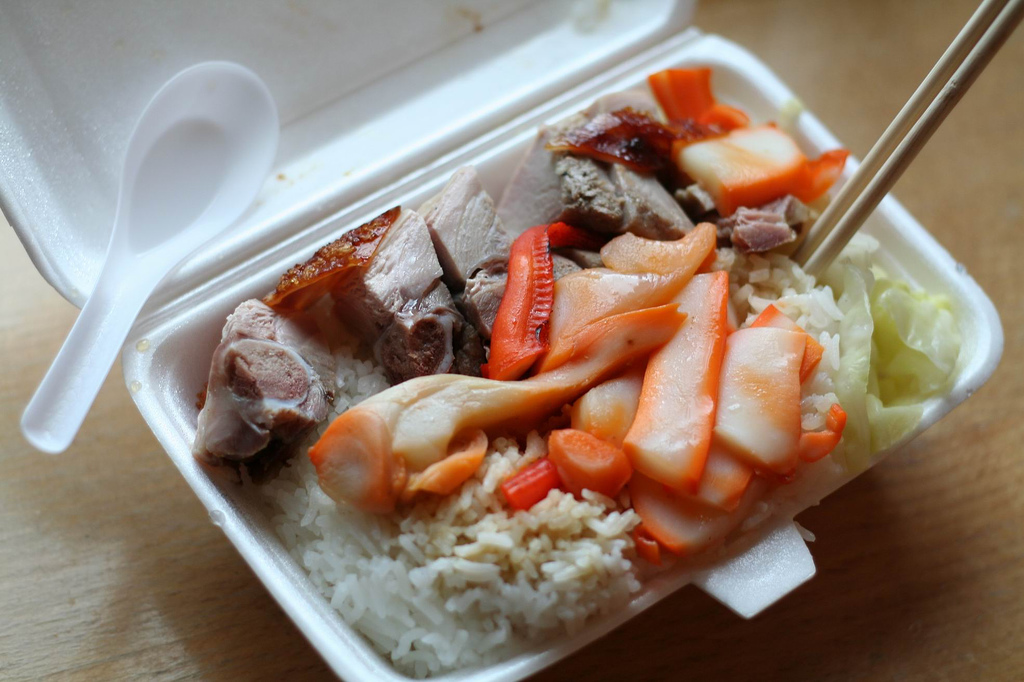
Siu mei with rice in a foam food container

Many disposable foodservice products can be made of plastic or plastic-coated paper: cups, plates, bowls, trays, food containers and cutlery, for example. Plastics are used because the material is lightweight and holds the temperature of hot/cold food and beverages. Foamed polystyrene (sometimes referred to as Styrofoam) is in one of the most common types of plastics used for foodservice packaging, in the form of the foam food container. Non-foamed polystyrene is sometimes also used for utensils or plastic plates. Polyethylene and other plastics are also used.

Plastic wrap is sometimes used to cover a tray of food.

Many plastics are marked with the SPI recycling codes for identification.

=== Paper and paperboard ===
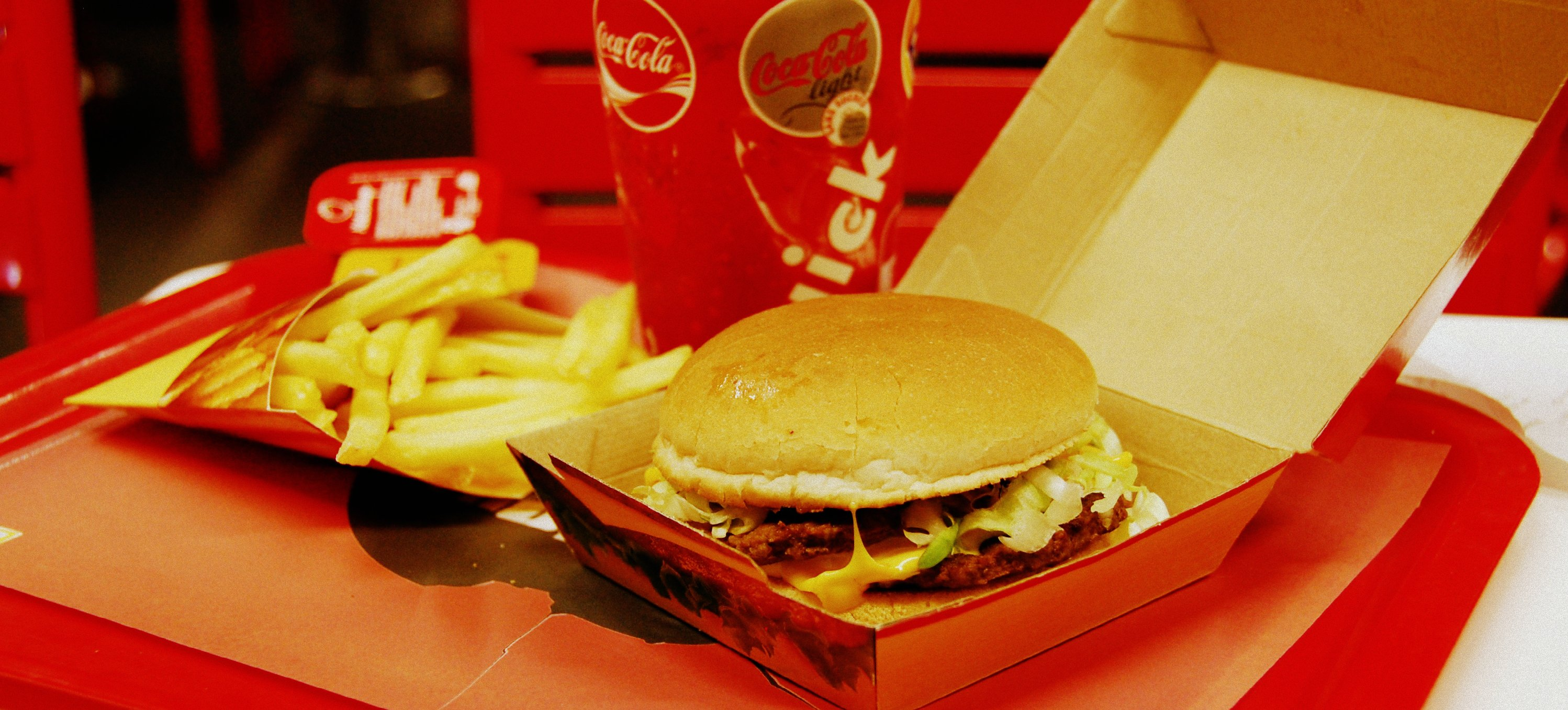
Paperboard clamshell for fast food

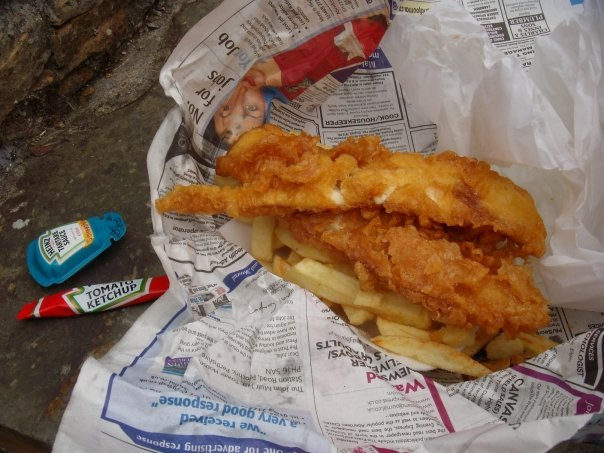
Fish and chips wrapped in wax paper then with used newspaper, packets of condiments

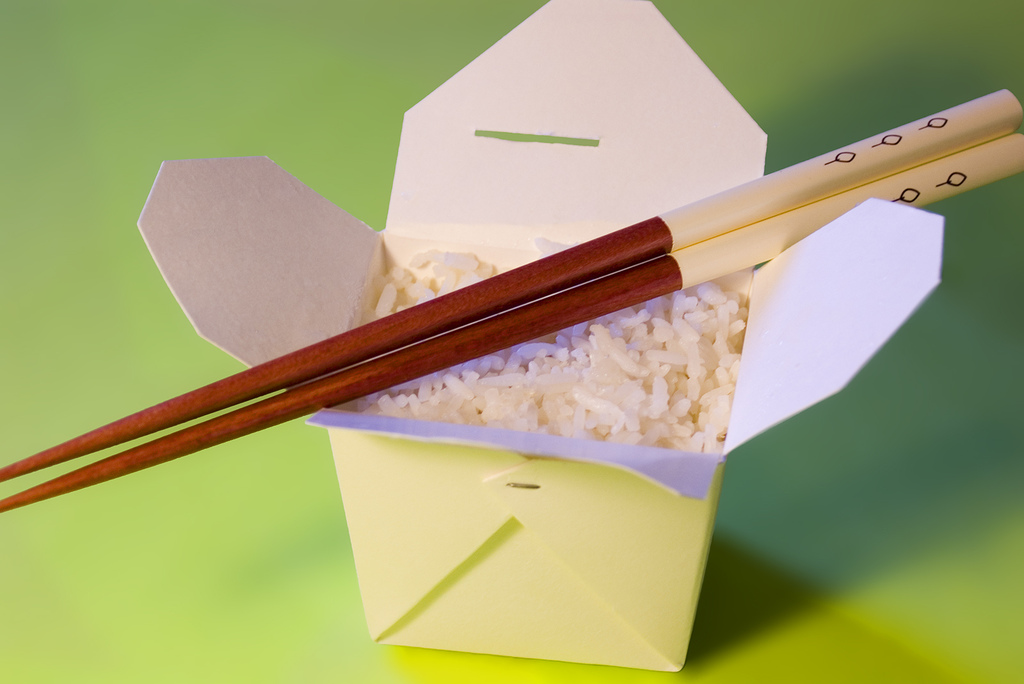
Rice in a paperboard oyster pail with single-use chopsticks

Disposable foodservice products made from paper, paperboard, and corrugated fiberboard include cups, plates, bowls, napkins, carryout bags, trays, egg cartons, doilies and tray liners. Some paper products are coated - mostly with plastic - or treated to improve wet strength or grease resistance. Paper and paperboard packaging like pizza trays, French fry trays, Chinese noodle soup boxes, hamburger clamshell trays, etc., are developed by printers utilizing paper-converting equipment such as tray formers.

Molded pulp products are made from recycled newsprint and are formed under heat and pressure into plates, bowls, trays and cup carriers. Molded pulp is readily recyclable.

=== Wood and bamboo ===
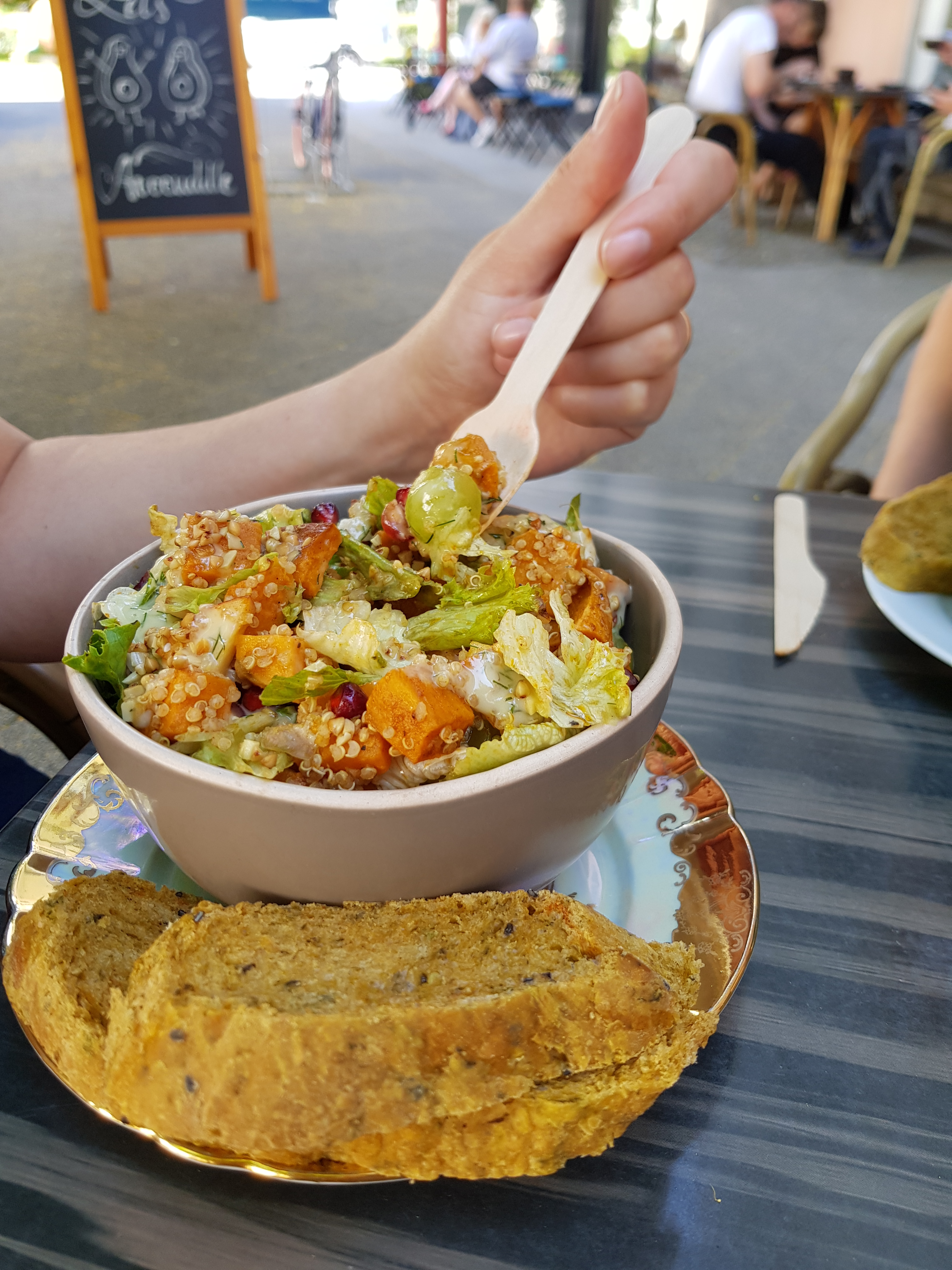
Disposable wooden fork

In recent years, manufacturers have been working on developing more sustainable alternatives to traditional plastic products. Amongst them are plates and cutlery made from bamboo and wood (mostly birch). Throughout the entire life cycle of wood products, there can be far fewer environmental repercussions than with traditional plastics, and possibly fewer with bioplastics like PLA, which composts into lactic acid. Wooden products decompose on average in the matter of a few months. Currently wood and bamboo products are more costly than traditional plastics and not as widely available, which makes it challenging for some restaurants to switch.

=== Alternative materials ===
A number of manufacturers are now making disposable foodservice products from a combination of natural starches, recycled fibers, water, air, and natural minerals. These composite products include cups, plates, bowls, cutlery, sandwich wraps, food containers and trays. Ideally these products are easily biodegradable and composted after use.

The material used to make these kinds of disposable foodservice products is primarily PLA or polylactic acid. Some products are made from a mixture of PLA and pulp fibers that are molded into disposable foodservice items with heat and pressure. Others are made from a composite or mixture of starch and other materials, such as limestone and recycled fibers, to give them additional strength.

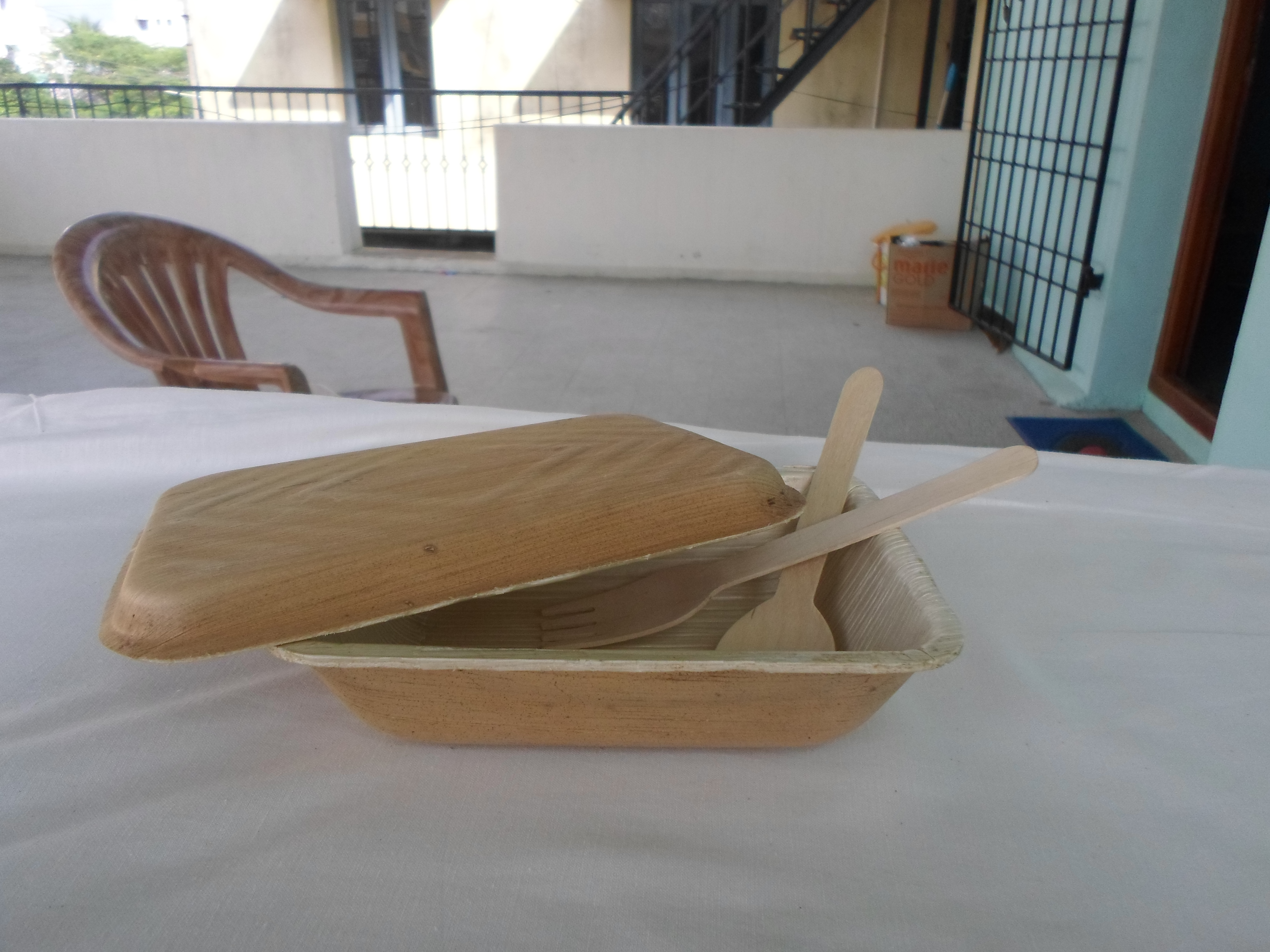
Areca palm food container

Areca palm plates are made from dry fallen leaves from the Areca catechu palm (betel tree). This trees shed the old dried leaves along with their sheath. These sheaths are separated from leaves and sent to the factory. The sheaths are then soaked and washed in clean water to remove the dust and sand particles. The sheaths are hot pressed and made into areca palm plates, bowls and food containers. Compared to other disposable items, areca palm products are 100% natural, eco-friendly. No synthetic adhesives or binders used in the manufacturing.

== Cost ==
By reducing the need for equipment and additional labor, disposable foodservice packaging is an economical alternative to multiuse items and eliminates the need for dishwashers and other support equipment (racks, carts, dollies, shelving, bins). It can also save money on water and energy used by dishwashers and can eliminate the need to replace reusables that are broken, damaged, stolen or accidentally discarded.

== Other economics ==
Disposable tableware was a key part of the business strategy of chain fast food restaurants in the US. In order for the business model to work, fast food chains, notably McDonald's, had to convince consumers through advertising campaigns to carry their own tableware to a waste bins, in order to avoid labor expenses incurred in clearing tables. By establishing a custom in which customers are encouraged to carry disposables, some of the internal costs of the disposable tableware can be offset.

== Environmental concerns ==
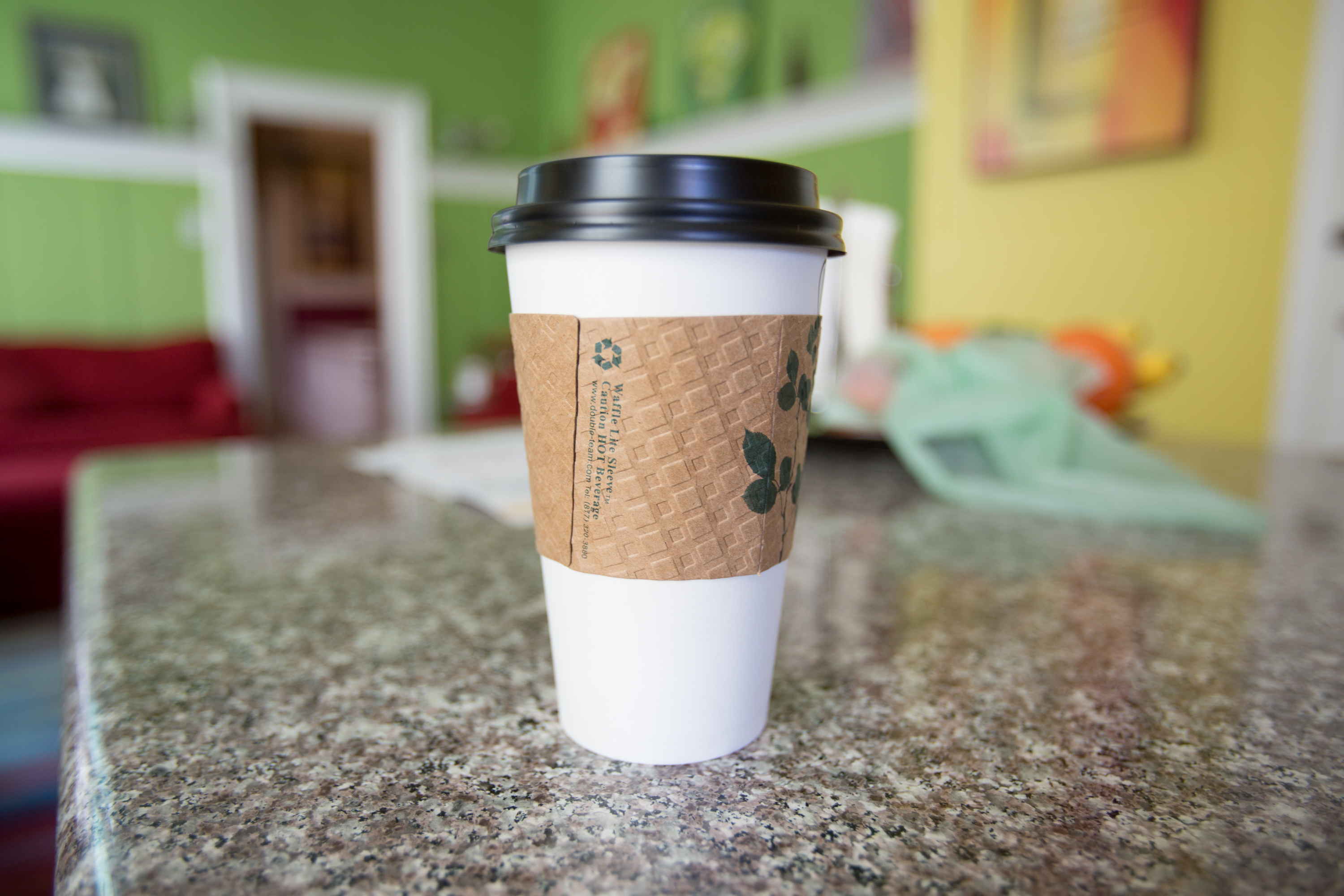
A coffee cup sleeve makes it easy to hold hot drinks.

=== Comparison with washable foodservice products ===
According to the U.S. Environmental Protection Agency, paper and plastic foodservice packaging discarded in the country's municipal solid waste stream accounted 1.3 percent in 2007 (by weight) of municipal solid waste. The U.S. Environmental Protection Agency also says that an often-cited waste prevention measure is the use of washable plates, cups, and napkins instead of the disposable variety.

While this will reduce solid waste, it will have other environmental effects, such as increased water and energy use. Overall, reusable dishware – even if only offered to customers for on-site use – is considered to be the best environmental choice.

=== Cost of recycling ===
Collection costs, the value of scrap material, and increased energy expenditures create an additional economic barrier to recycling foodservice packaging. While recycling foodservice packaging is difficult, recycled materials are being used in some foodservice packaging.

=== Environmental footprint ===
Many people are working on reducing the environmental footprint of packaging for food service. Often a Life-cycle assessment is valuable to determine the effects throughout the entire system. Some actions include:

- Packaging of incoming food and supplies can work towards the broad sustainable packaging guidelines offered by many organizations. This includes the recycling of packaging generated within the restaurant.
- Packaging products used by the restaurant can include specified amounts of recycled content in the products.
- Many packaging products can be compostable, but care is needed to match the needs of regional composting facilities. Sometimes products can be certified to meet international standards such as ASTM International D6400, ASTM D6868, and EN 13432.
- Some single-use food packaging is recyclable but food contamination of products is often a problem for recyclers.

=== Illusion of recycling and "recyclable" claims ===
Disposable-product manufacturers frequently include "recyclable" or "please recycle" indicia on their products; however the availability and effectiveness of such recycling campaigns is limited. A common approach of restaurants featuring disposable tableware is to label one or more of their waste bins as "recycling", although realistically, the amount of washing required for effective recycling would make such "recycling" unrealistic. In addition to greenwashing, these approaches are intended to encourage consumers to buy disposable tableware. Some experts view a total ban of single-use packaging as the only solution. For example, the Chinese government stated that by the end of 2020, non-degradable bags will be banned in major cities, and by 2022, the policy will come into force in smaller settlements.

== Bans and charges ==
In the European Union (EU), the directive on single-use plastics (SUPD, EU 2019/904), in force since 3 July 2021, bans the retail sale of disposable food packaging items. The ban applies in the EU, Iceland, Liechtenstein, and Norway (not in Switzerland), and the following items are banned:

- cutlery (forks, knives, spoons, and chopsticks)
- plates
- beverage stirrers
- food containers made of expanded polystyrene (i.e. boxes, with or without a cover) for immediate consumption without any further preparation, typically consumed from the container or ready to be consumed without further preparation;
- beverage containers made of expanded polystyrene, including their caps and lids
- cups for beverages made of expanded polystyrene, including their covers and lids

In Germany, in 2022 Tübingen was the first city to introduce a charge on single-use food packaging, to be paid by local restaurants. A Germany-wide tax on single-use plastic manufacturers was enacted in 2023, with the first levies due in 2025.

== See also ==
- Disposable tableware – Disposable table utensils
- Drinking straw – Thin tube for drinking liquids
- Military rations
