= Disposable cup =

Drinking cup intended for a single use

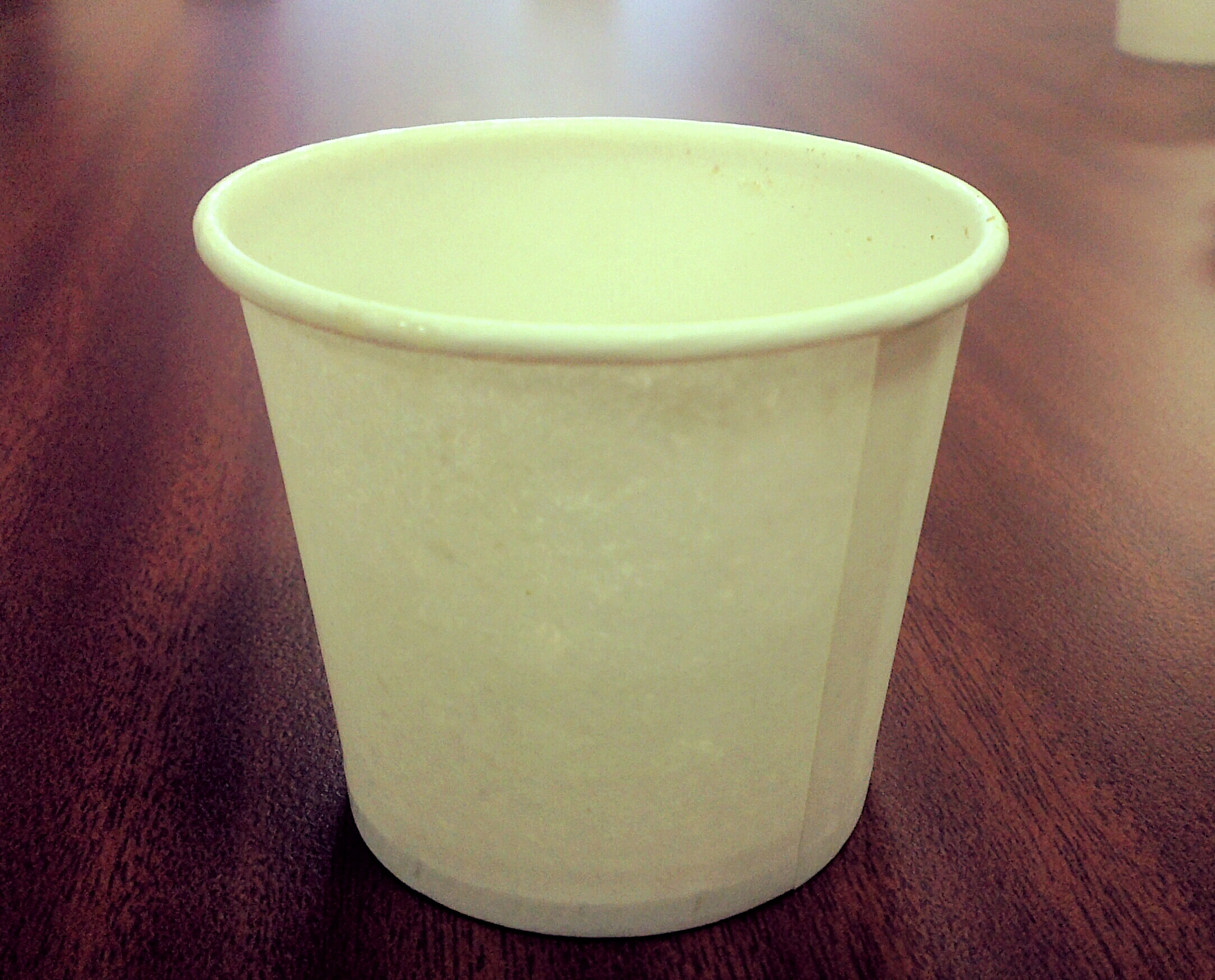
A disposable paper cup

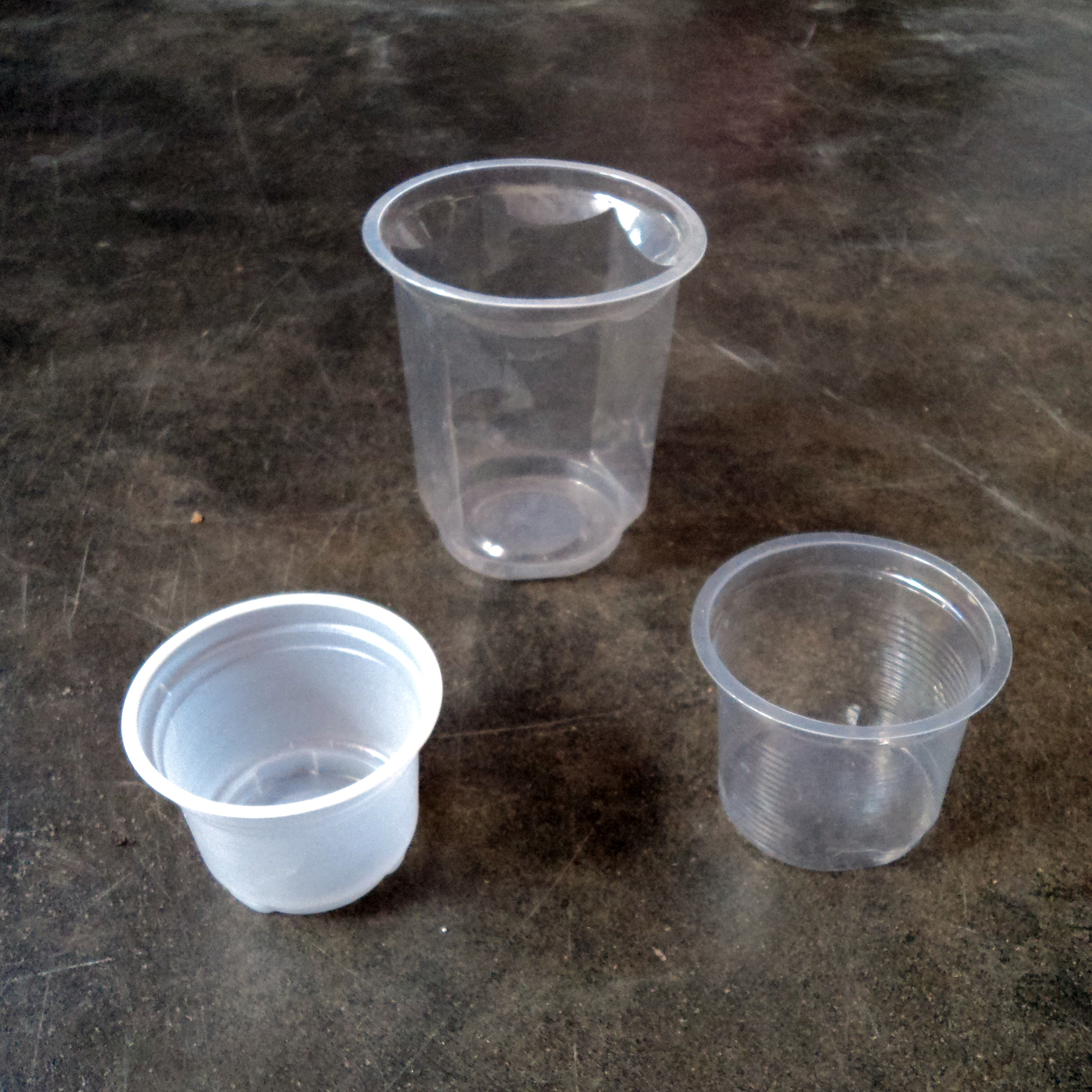
Disposable plastic cups

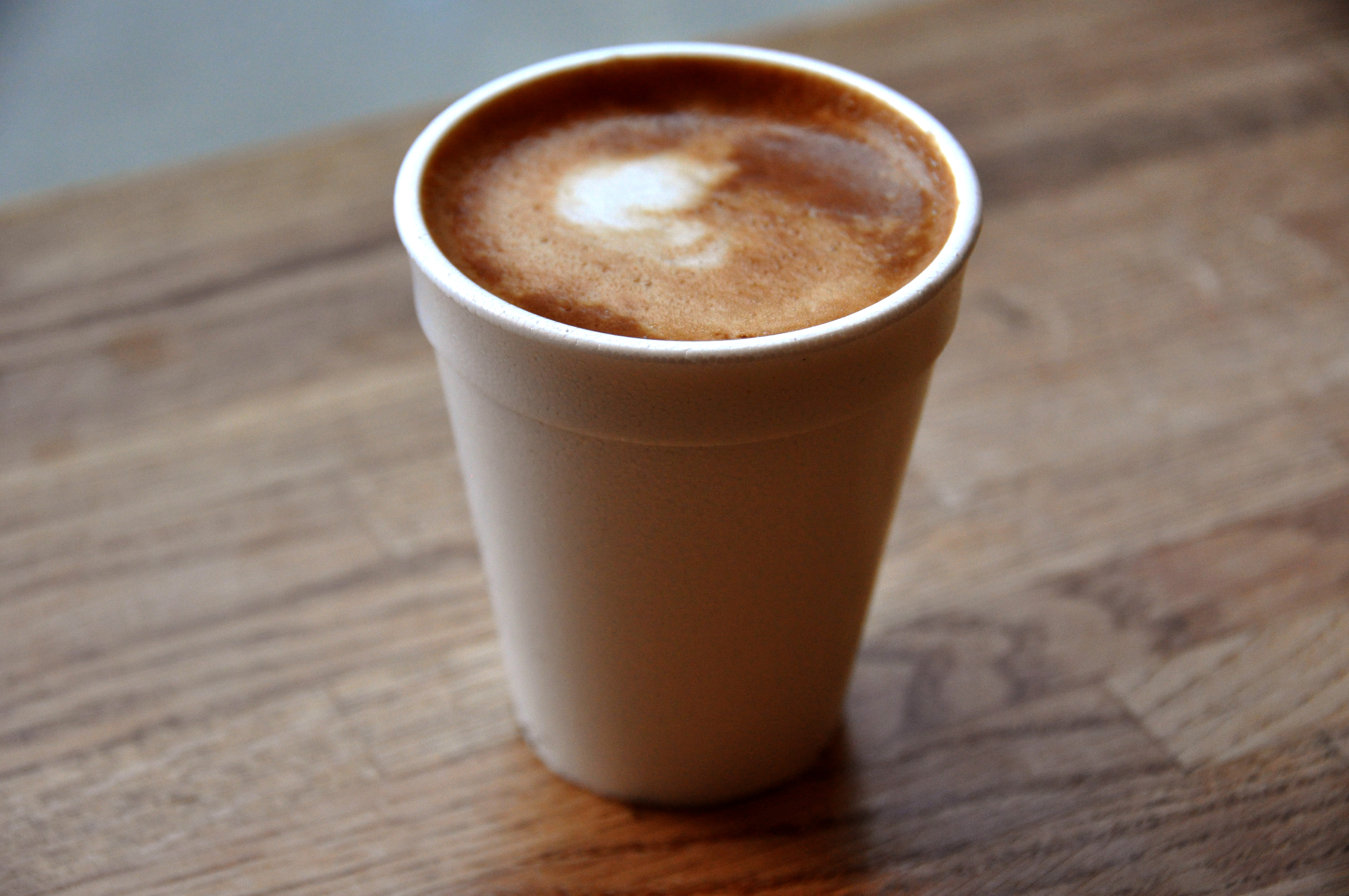
A disposable foam cup containing coffee

A disposable cup is a type of tableware and disposable food packaging. Disposable cup types include paper cups, plastic cups, and foam cups. Expanded polystyrene is used to manufacture foam cups, and polypropylene is used to manufacture plastic cups.

As they are produced for single use, disposable cups and other similar disposable products constitute a major source of consumer and household waste, such as paper waste and plastic waste. It has been estimated that the average household discards around 70 disposable cups every year.

In the United States, an estimated 108 billion cups are consumed per year, and the United Kingdom an estimated 2.5 billion paper cups every year.

== History ==
The disposable cone-shaped paper cup was invented in 1908 by Lawrence Luellen, and in 1912 Luellen and Hugh Moore began marketing the Health Kup, another paper disposable cup. The Health Kup was designed to create a means for people to drink water from public water barrels without spreading germs, which occurred when people would use a common (shared) cup or a dipper to hold the water. The Health Kup was later renamed to Dixie Cup, and was named after a brand of dolls. Luellen and Moore later developed a disposable paper ice cream cup, which included lids with images of sportspeople, movie stars and animals.

== Commercial uses ==
Some companies, such as coffee retailers and doughnut shops, sell their products in disposable cups. A 2011 book estimated that a chain of doughnut shops used one billion disposable coffee cups in a year, enough to circle the Earth twice. A 2012 article in OnEarth said that Starbucks used over four billion disposable coffee cups in 2011. The Cup Noodles brand of instant noodles uses expanded polystyrene foam cups to contain the product. Hot or boiling water is added to the dried noodles in the container, which cooks the product in a few minutes. Nissin Foods began marketing the product in foam cups in the early 1970s.

== Pollution ==
The manufacturing of paper cups contributes to water pollution when chemicals such as chlorine, chlorine dioxide and reduced sulfides enter waterways. The manufacturing of foam cups contributes to air pollution when pentane is released into the air. The plastic content in plastic-coated paper cups contributes to the plastic pollution problem, when cups are disposed as litter.

== Recycling and other environmental measures ==
The curbside recycling of polypropylene containers has gradually increased in some developed countries, but is still rather limited.

McDonald's switched from foam cups to paper cups in 2014, and is moving to recycle paper cups in the UK, as of 2016, in partnership with Simply Cups and James Cropper.

== Alternatives ==
Several coffee chains offer a discount if the customer brings along their own cup.

At festivals such as the Bavarian Oktoberfest, costs due to theft or breakage are avoided without using disposables: The customer pays an upfront fee for a drinking glass or mug and receives a rebate at its return.

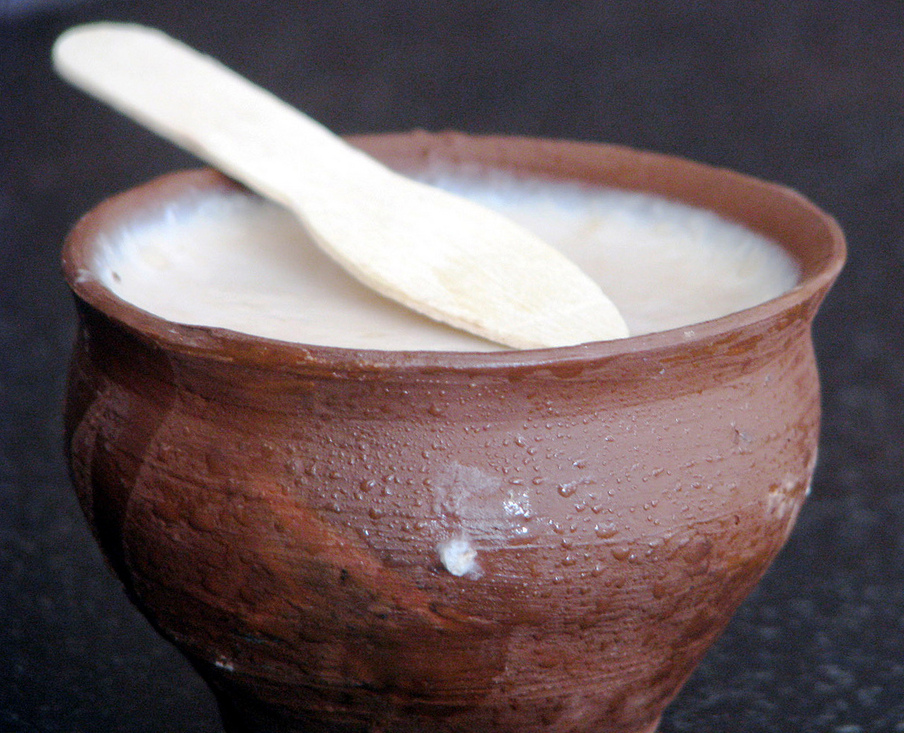
A disposable kulhar clay bowl with dahi (curd)

A kulhar is a traditional handleless clay cup from South Asia, which is used as an alternative to plastic cups due to its biodegradable nature. They are typically unpainted and unglazed, and meant to be disposable. The most interesting feature of kulhar is its not being painted and that differentiates a kulhar from a terra-cotta cup. The kulhar cup is unglazed inside out. Since kulhars are made by firing in a kiln and are almost never reused, they are inherently sterile and hygienic. Bazaars and food stalls in the Indian subcontinent traditionally served hot beverages, such as tea, in kulhars, which suffused the beverage with an "earthy aroma" that was often considered appealing. Yoghurt, hot milk with sugar as well as some regional desserts, such as kulfi (traditional ice-cream), are also served in kulhars. Kulhars have gradually given way to polystyrene and coated paper cups, because the latter are lighter to carry in bulk and cheaper.

== See also ==
- Disposable tableware
- Disposable food packaging
- Throw-away society
- Solo cup
