= Disposable tableware =

Disposable table utensils

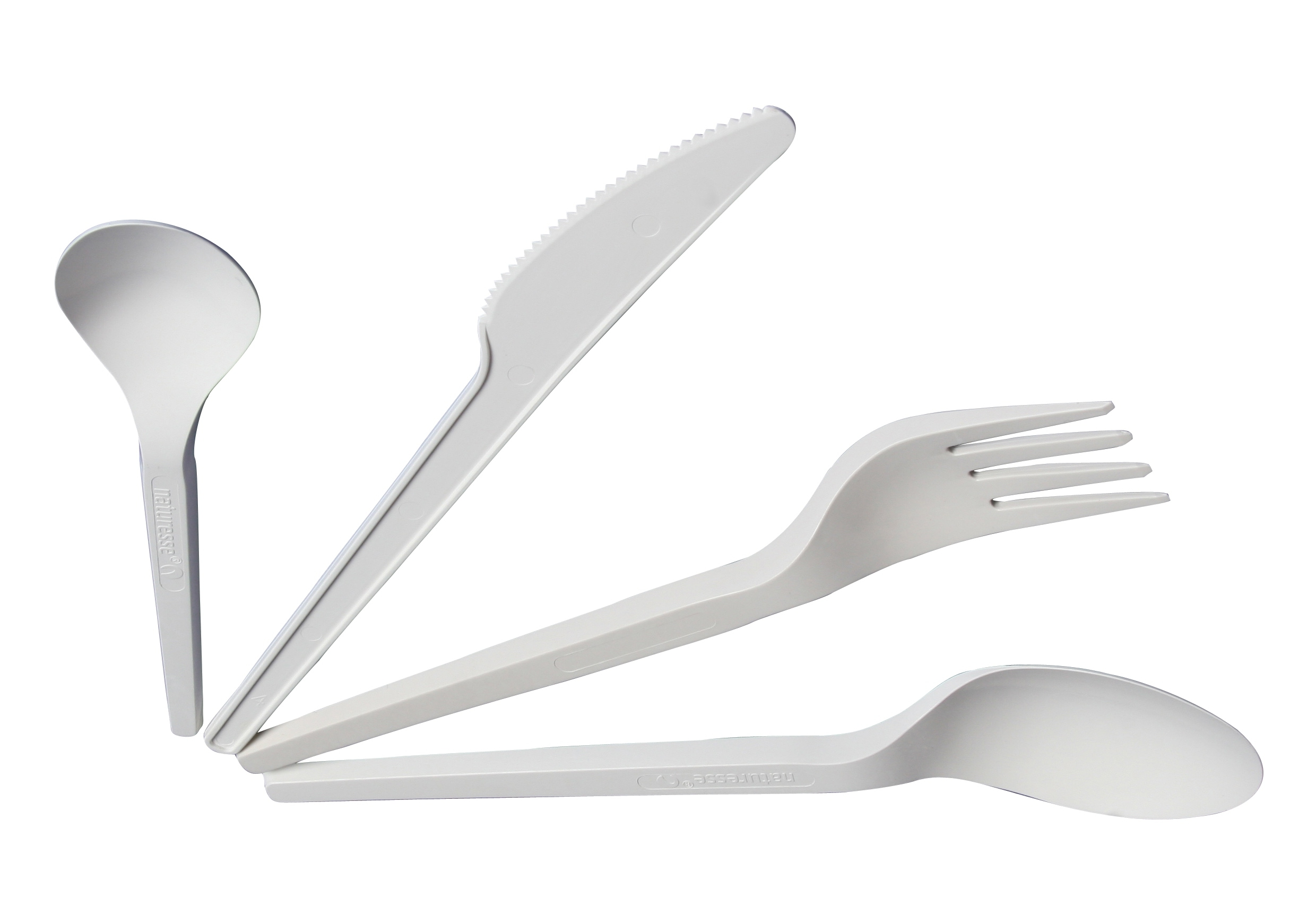
A selection of disposable plastic utensils

Disposable tableware includes all disposable tableware like

- disposable cups made of paper, plastic, coated paper,
- plates,
  - paper plates, initially patented by US inventor, Mouritz P. Toepfer, in 1904,
- tablecloths,
- placemats
- plastic cutlery,
- paper napkins, etc.

These products are prevalent in fast food restaurants, takeaways, but also for airline meals. In private settings, this kind of disposable products has proven very popular with consumers who prefer easy and quick cleanup after parties, etc.

In the US, the market for disposable tableware is worth an estimated $7.5 billion as of 2012.

== Kulhar ==
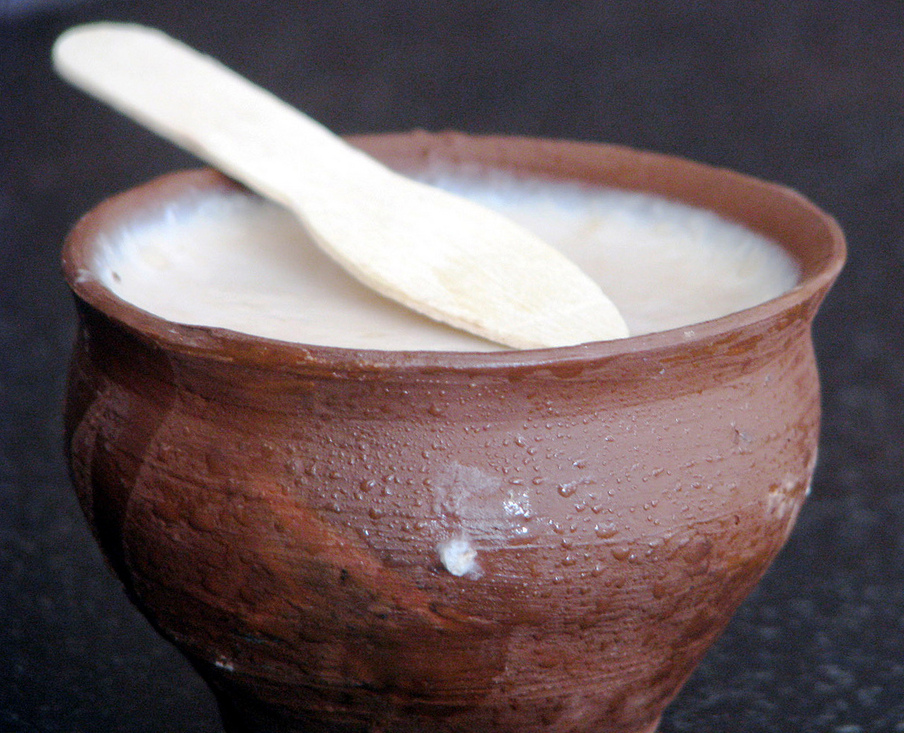
A disposable kulhar clay bowl with dahi (curd)

A kulhar is a traditional handle-less clay cup from South Asia that is typically unpainted and unglazed, and meant to be disposable. Since kulhars are made by firing in a kiln and are almost never reused, they are inherently sterile and hygienic. Bazaars and food stalls in the Indian subcontinent traditionally served hot beverages, such as tea, in kuhlars, which suffused the beverage with an "earthy aroma" that was often considered appealing. Yoghurt, hot milk with sugar as well as some regional desserts, such as kulfi (traditional ice-cream), are also served in kulhars. Kulhars have gradually given way to polystyrene and coated paper cups, because the latter are lighter to carry in bulk and cheaper.

== Environmental impacts ==
As is the case for disposable cups, materials used are usually paper, plastic (including expanded polystyrene foam), or plastic-coated paper. Recycling rates are especially low for paper-based products, especially when soiled with (wet and / or oily) scraps due to diminished recyclate quality. The waste problem is aggravated by the fact that most of the utilities themselves come in plastic and thus disposable packaging.

Efforts are made to introduce biodegradable materials like sugarcane, bamboo, wheat straw, palm leaves, or various types of flours (rice, wheat and sorghum). Nevertheless, biodegradable and composable plastics often do not break down in landfill environments.

== See also ==
- Disposable food packaging
- Criticism of fast food
- Edible tableware – Utensil made of food or which can be eaten
