= Laminated paper =

Laminated paper may refer to:

- Plastic-coated paper
- Lamination paper
