= Foam food container =

Form of disposable food packaging

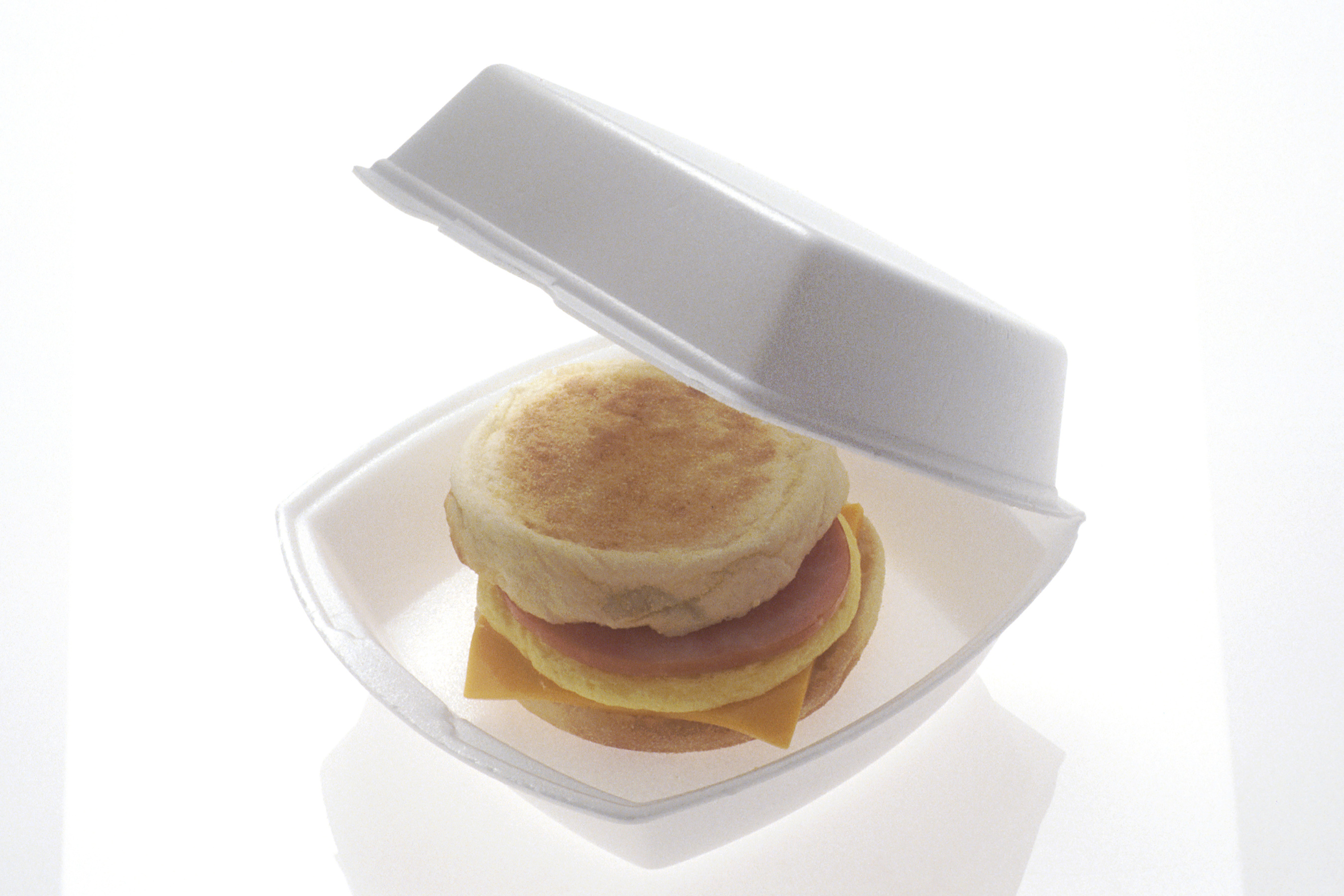
Foam clamshell container with a breakfast sandwich

A foam food container is a form of disposable food packaging for various foods and beverages, such as processed instant noodles, raw meat from supermarkets, ice cream from ice cream parlors, cooked food from delicatessens or food stalls, or beverages like "coffee to go". They are also commonly used to serve takeout food from restaurants, and are also available by request for diners who wish to take home the remainder of their meal. The foam is a good thermal insulator, making the container easy to carry as well as keeping the food at the temperature it had when filled into the container, whether hot or cold.

== Construction and composition ==
Foam take-out containers are made from expanded polystyrene (EPS) foam, or another type of polystyrene foam, and produced by injecting the foam into a mold. They are usually white in color, although they may be printed or impressed with a company logo or other message.

EPS foam is sometimes incorrectly called Styrofoam as a generic term. Styrofoam is a trademark of The Dow Chemical Company for closed-cell extruded polystyrene (XPS) foam, used for thermal insulation and craft applications. By contrast, EPS foam is typically white and made of expanded polystyrene beads, and used for disposable coffee cups, coolers, or as cushioning material in packaging.

Another trade name for EPS is thermacol, originated by BASF.

== Varieties ==
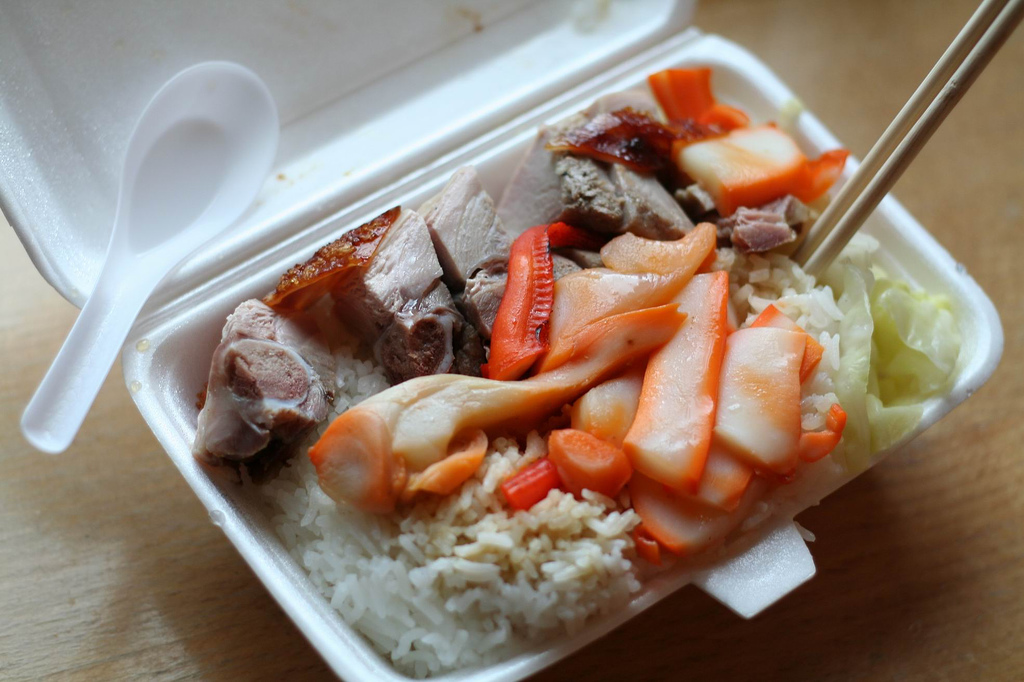
Siu mei with rice in a foam takeout container

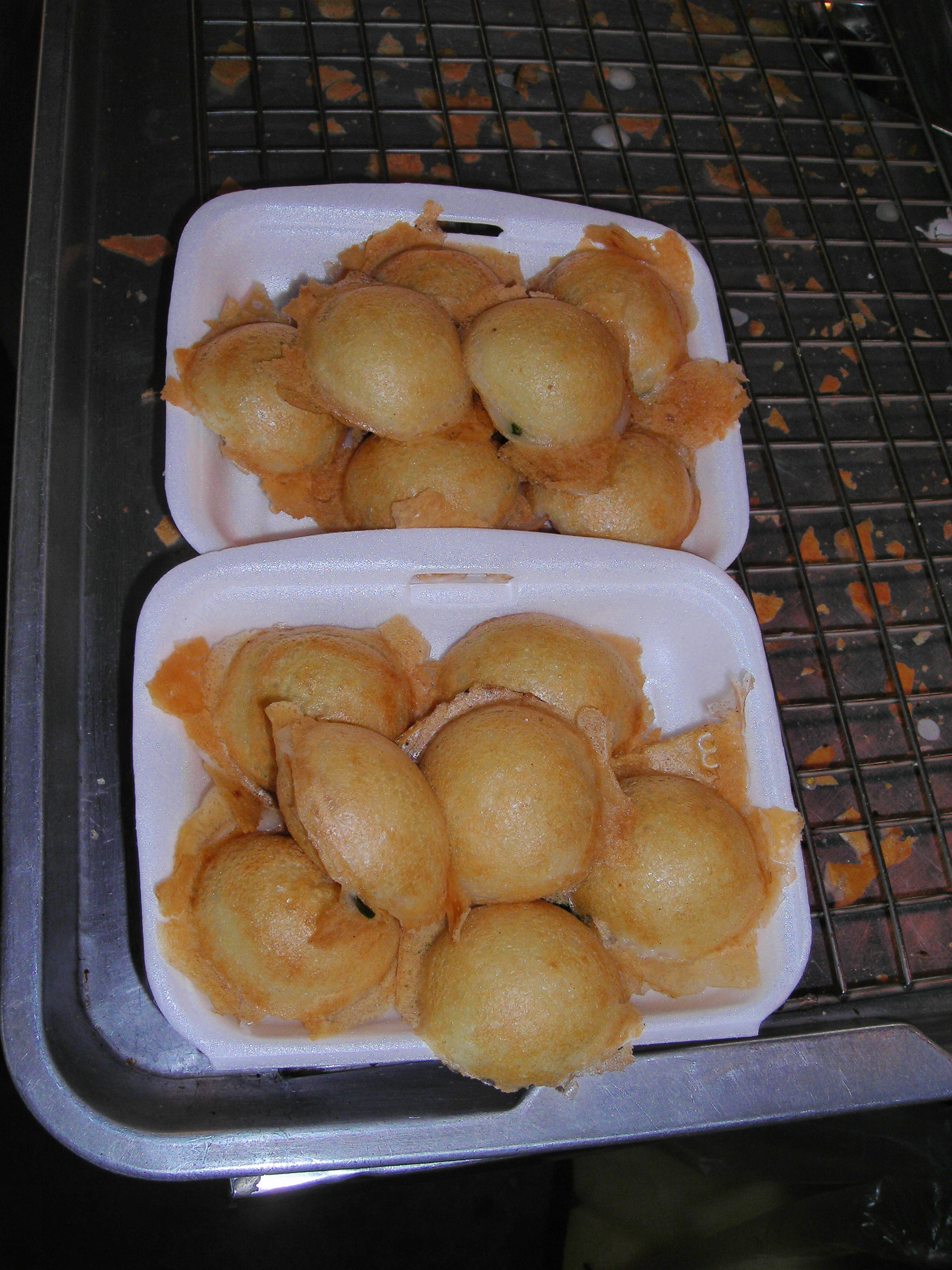
Khanom krok on foam trays

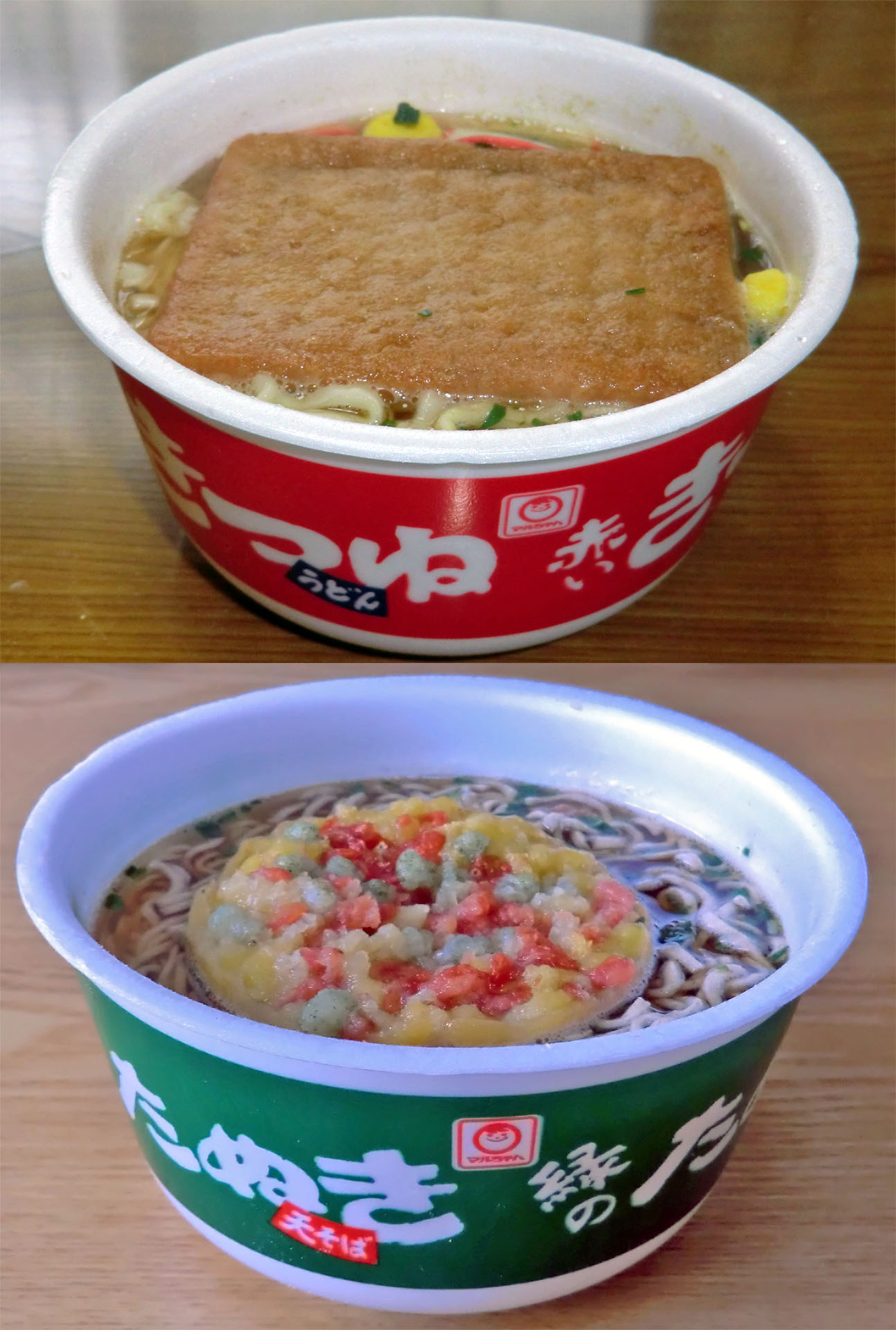
Japanese cup meals

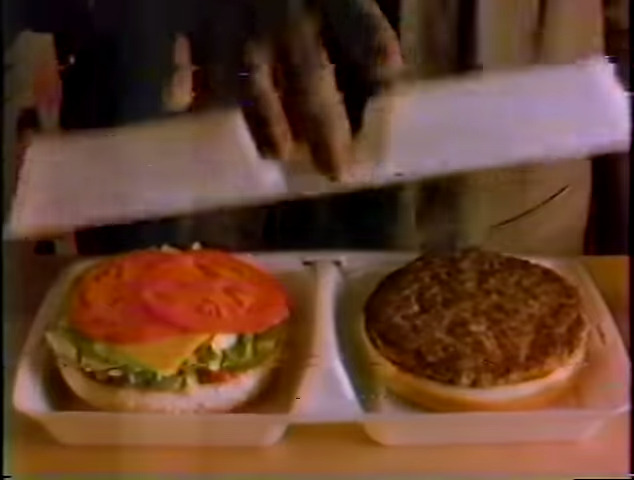
McDLT box with a "cold" side and a "hot" side

The different varieties of foam takeout containers may include:

- A rectangular shaped clamshell style container with an attached lid, which comes in various sizes. The larger ones usually feature several compartments, allowing different foods to be kept separated from each other. This variety usually features several small projections on the lid of the container, which fit through slots on the bottom half to "lock" it, therefore keeping the cover closed. These containers are leak-resistant only if kept upright, and often have a square imprint area for labeling.
- A cylindrical style container with a separate, translucent or opaque plastic lid which can seal tightly to resist leaks. The container may or may not taper somewhat towards the bottom. Both overall size and the ratio of height to diameter can vary greatly. Such containers usually hold soups and stews; however, smaller varieties are often used to hold sauces and condiments.

== Chinese cuisine ==
Foam containers are the most commonly used takeout box for Chinese cuisines in East and Southeast Asia. It is standard for Cantonese cuisine in Hong Kong and many parts of China and sometimes used overseas in various restaurants, particularly in the United States and Canada.

== Environmental issues ==
Foam takeout containers entirely made out of polystyrene foam affect the environment as they do not biodegrade easily. However, microbial degradation of styrene via methanogens has been investigated and confirmed, intermediate products being various organic substances and carbon dioxide. Pseudomonas putida can also convert styrene oil into various biodegradable polyhydroxyalkanoates. Some cities have banned the use of foam take-out containers, notably San Francisco, Seattle and Portland, Oregon. In 2013, the mayor of New York City proposed banning foam food containers for both health and environmental reasons. Implementation of this plan was put on hold while the ban was litigated by restaurant owners and polystyrene manufacturers. After three years of litigation, a judge ruled in favor of the city. In 2019, New York State Governor Andrew Cuomo proposed a state-wide ban.

== Health issues ==
According to American Cancer society the use of polystyrene is safe for food services.

Styrene is considered by both the EPA and IARC to be a possible carcinogen. It poses a health risk to workers involved in the production of styrene and polystyrene items, and industries have a compliance program to deal with liabilities. Prolonged exposure to high amounts of styrene may affect the central nervous system.

== See also ==
- Clamshell (container)
- Oyster pail
- Disposable food packaging
