= Paper cup =

Cup mostly made of paper or card

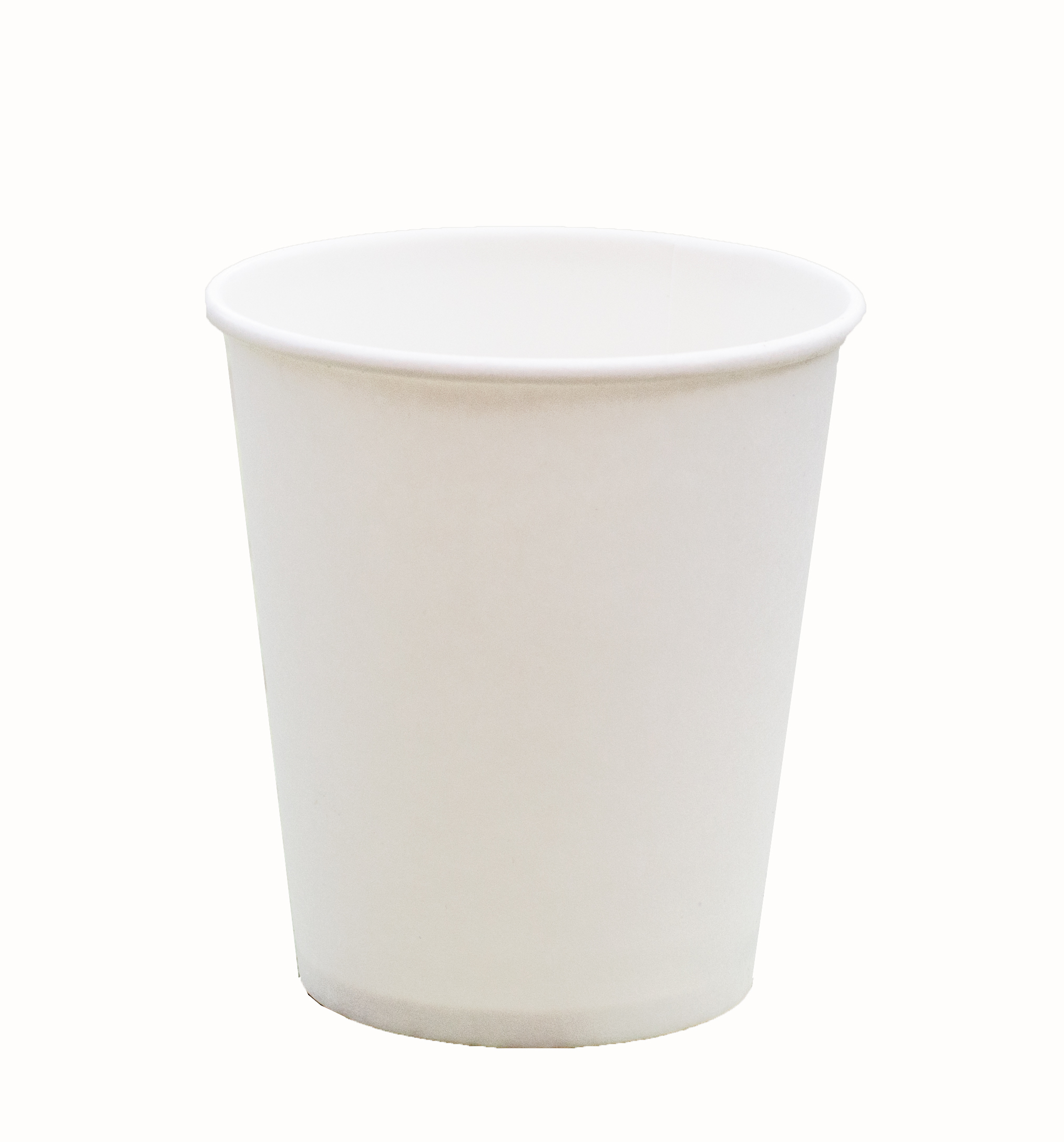
Plain paper cup

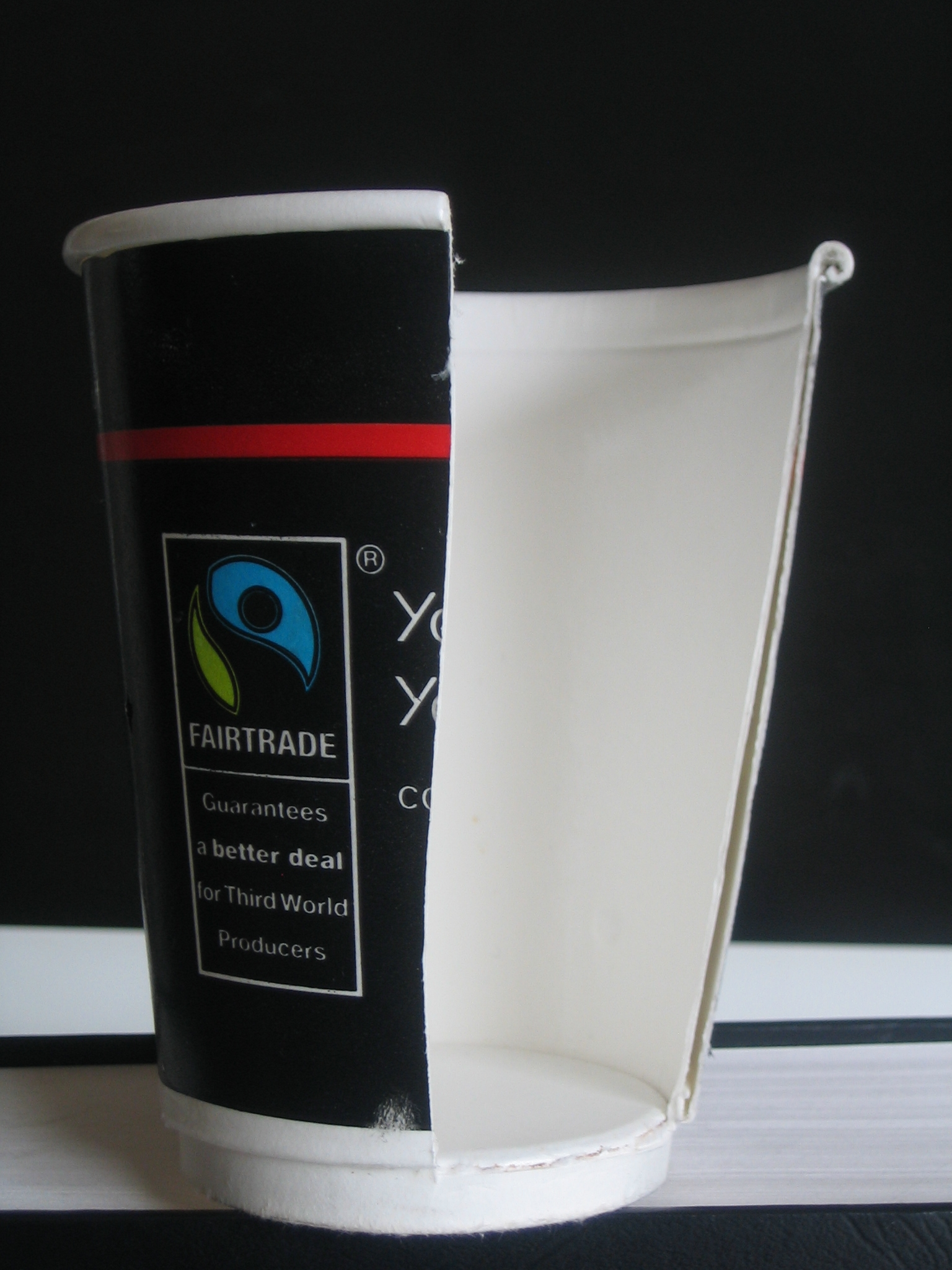
Insulated paper cup for hot drinks, cut away to show air layer

A paper cup is a disposable cup made out of paper and often lined or coated with plastic or wax to prevent liquid from leaking out or soaking through the paper. Disposable cups in shared environments have become more common for hygienic reasons after the advent of the germ theory of disease. Due mainly to environmental concerns, modern disposable cups may be made of recycled paper.

== History ==
Paper cups have been documented in imperial China, where paper was invented by the 2nd century BC. Paper cups were known as chih pei and were used for the serving of tea. They were constructed in different sizes and colors, and were adorned with decorative designs. Textual evidence of paper cups appears in a description of the possessions of the Yu family, from the city of Hangzhou.

The modern paper cup was developed in the 20th century. In the early 20th century, it was common to have shared glasses or dippers at water sources such as school faucets or water barrels in trains. This shared use caused public health concerns. One notable investigation into their use was the study by Alvin Davison, biology professor at Lafayette College, published with the sensational title "Death in School Drinking Cups" in Technical World Magazine in August 1908, based on research carried out in Easton, Pennsylvania's public schools. The article was reprinted and distributed by the Massachusetts State Board of Health in November 1909.

Based on these concerns, and as paper goods (especially after the 1908 invention of the Dixie Cup) became cheaply and cleanly available, local bans in the USA were passed on the shared-use cup. One of the first American railway companies to use disposable paper cups was the Lackawanna Railroad, which began using them in 1909. By 1917, the public glass had disappeared from American railway carriages, replaced by paper cups even in jurisdictions around the USA where public glasses had yet to be banned.

Paper cups are also employed in hospitals for health reasons. In 1942 the Massachusetts State College found in one study that the cost of using washable glasses, re-used after being sanitized, was 1.6 times the cost of using single-service paper cups. These studies, as well as the reduction in the risk of cross-infection, encouraged the use of paper cups in American hospitals.

=== Dixie cups ===
Dixie Cup is the brand name for a line of disposable paper cups that were first developed in the United States in 1907 by Lawrence Luellen, an inventor in Boston, Massachusetts, who was concerned about germs being spread by people sharing glasses or dippers at public supplies of drinking water. Luellen developed an ice-cooled water-vending machine with disposable cups, and with another Bostonian, Hugh Moore, embarked on an advertising campaign to educate the public and to market his machine, principally to American railroad companies. Davison's study was instrumental in abolishing the public glass and opening the door for the paper cup in the USA. Soon, the devices, which would dispense cool water for one cent, became standard equipment on trains in the US.

After Lawrence Luellen invented his paper cup and corresponding water fountain, he started the American Water Supply Company of New England in 1908 located in Boston. The company began producing the cup as well as the Water Vendor. In order to expand their territory, Luellen organized the American Water Supply Company of New York as well as the American Water Supply Company of New Jersey with the help of Hugh Moore. Instead of producing the cups and fountains, these subsidiary companies were charged with the sale and distribution of Luellen's products. In 1909 Luellen and Moore started the Public Cup Vendor Company in New York in order to lease their vendor machines. Their primary customers were railroads so that the devices could be implemented on passenger train cars. After many states in the US started to ban the common drinking cup in public places, steady orders for Luellen's machine began to roll in. The success of Luellen and Moore's territorial companies inspired them to incorporate into the Individual Drinking Cup Company of New York in 1910.

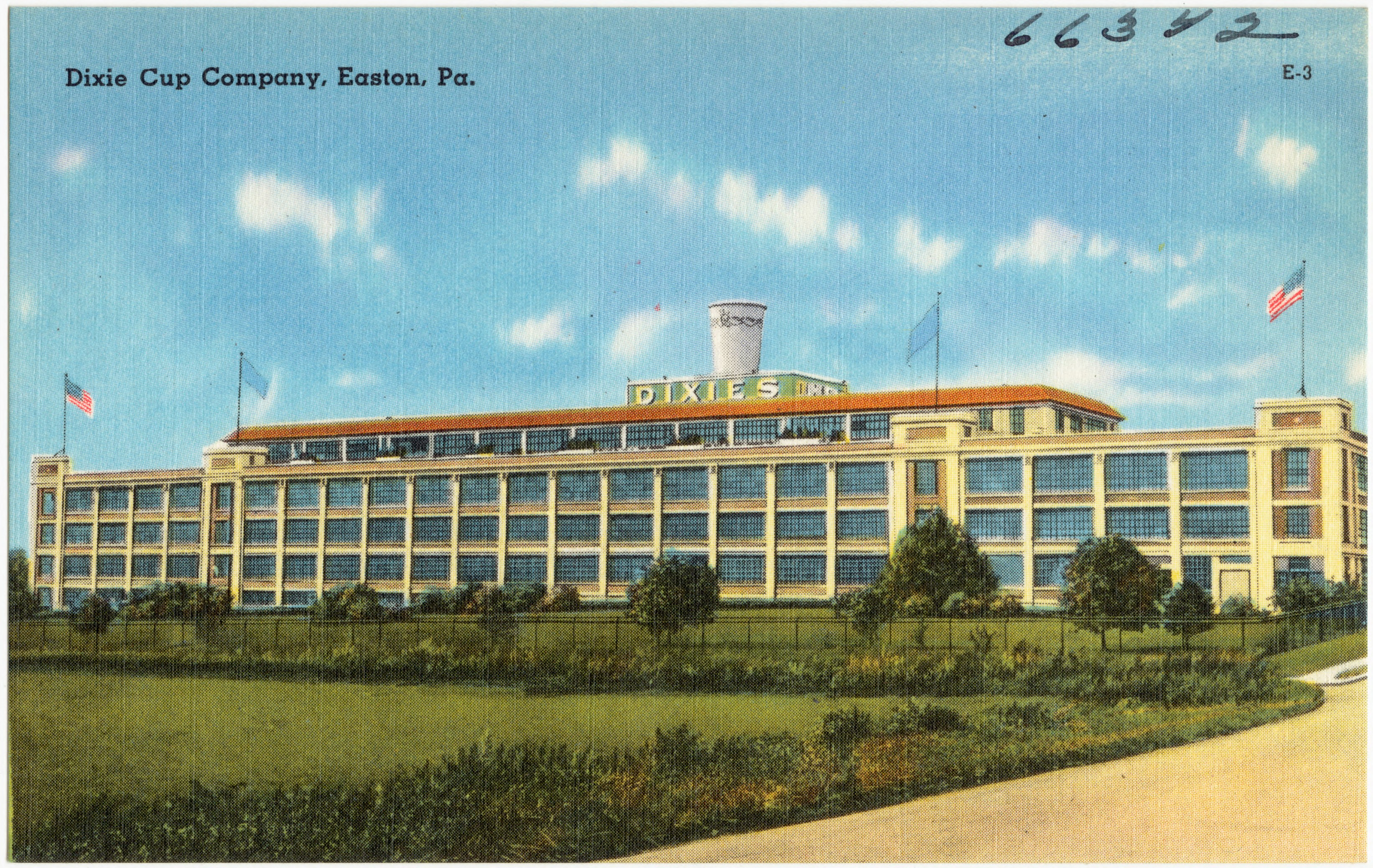
Dixie Cup Company, Easton, Pennsylvania

The Dixie Cup was first called "Health Kup", but from 1919 it was named after a line of dolls made by Alfred Schindler's Dixie Doll Company in New York. Success led the company, which had existed under a variety of names, to call itself the Dixie Cup Corporation and move to a factory in Wilson, Pennsylvania. Atop the factory was a large water tank in the shape of a cup. The water tank was removed on April 30, 2026.

In 1957, Dixie merged with the American Can Company. The James River Corporation purchased American Can's paper business in 1982. The assets of James River are now part of Georgia-Pacific, a subsidiary of Koch Industries, the second largest privately owned company in the United States. In 1983, production moved to a modern factory in Forks, Pennsylvania. The original factory in Wilson has sat vacant ever since. The closing of the factory also prompted Conrail to abandon the Easton & Northern railroad branch, of which Dixie Cups was the last major customer.

In 1969, the Dixie Cup logo was created by Saul Bass, a graphic designer known for his motion picture title sequences.

A generalization of the coupon collector's problem, where one needs 2 (or any arbitrary larger number) of each coupon, instead of just 1, is sometimes called the Dixie cup problem; the name is inspired by children trying to collect "a complete set of pictures of baseball players, movie stars, etc., which appear on the covers of dixie cups" and trading with each other as they all try to create a complete set.

== Early advertisements ==
The tone of many of the advertisements created by the Dixie Cup Company took the form of embracing modern ideals and marketing towards people who wanted to improve their lives and jump on board a new trend for fear of being left behind. "This is the sanitary age – the age of Dixie Cups" was used for several years with success.

A subsequent pivot towards soda fountains was made in both product line and advertising, but the central idea of individual use as more sanitary than reusable glasses persisted. An emphasis on the theme of cups being "touched only by you" was seen as an act to make the cups seem individualized.

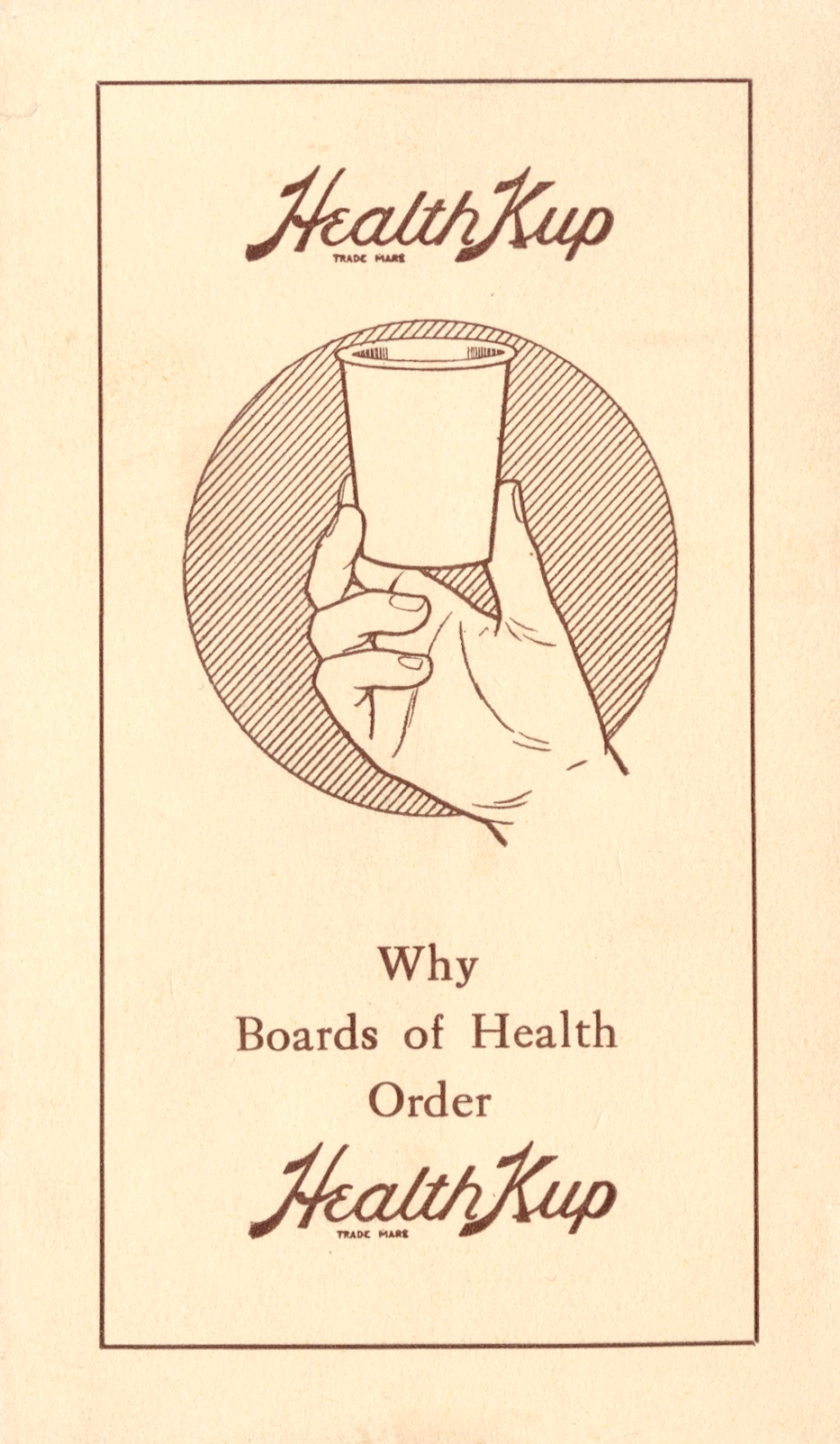
Early advertisement for Dixie Cups when they were still known as Health Kups.

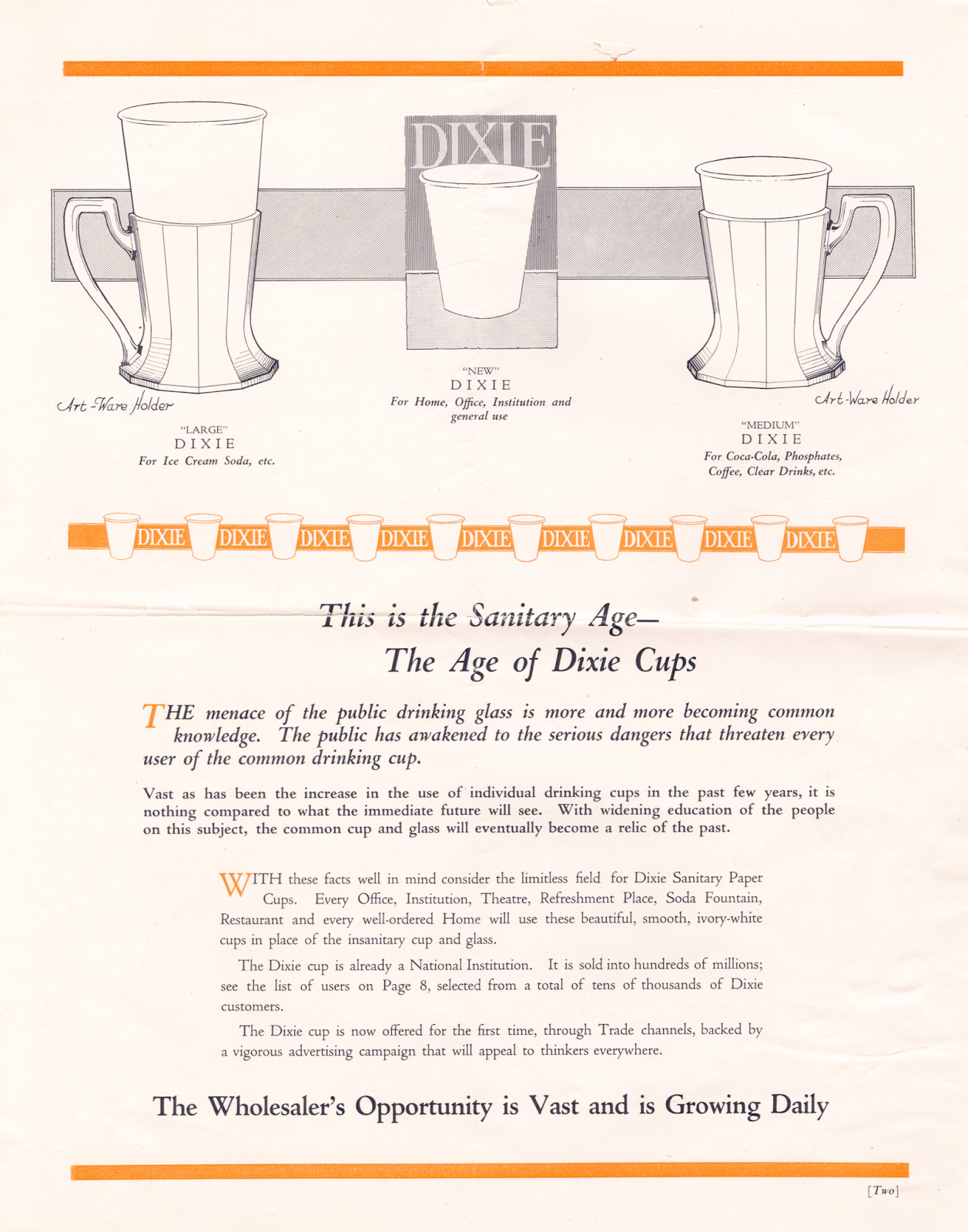
"This is the Sanitary Age" advertisement for Dixie Cups.

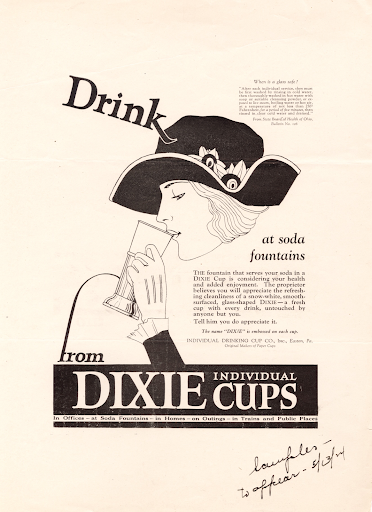
Another early advertisement from Dixie

== Manufacture ==
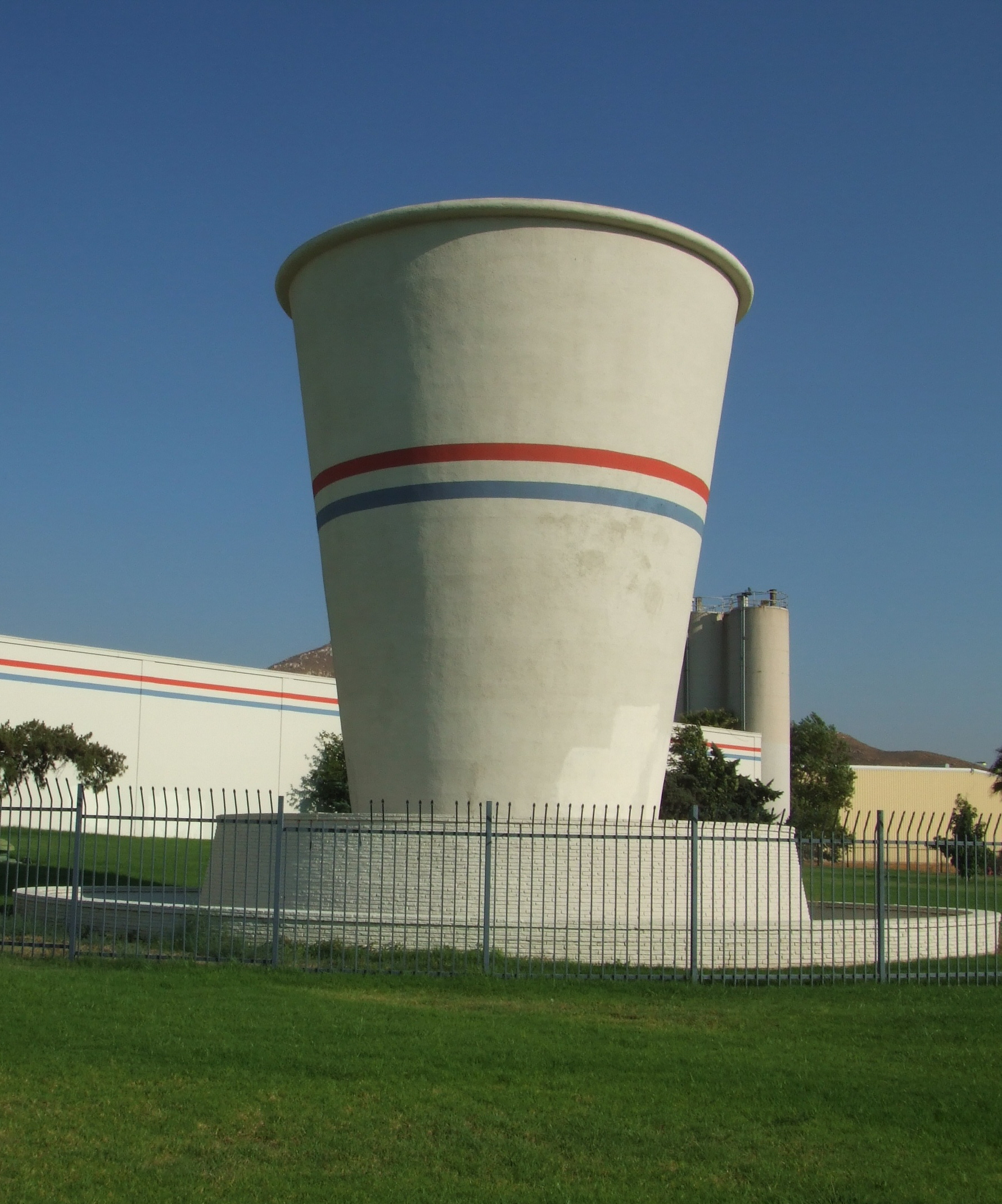
The world's largest "paper" cup in front of what was once the Lily-Tulip manufacturing company, later Sweetheart Cup Company. Made of poured concrete, the cup stands about 68.1 feet (20.8 m) tall.

The base paper for paper cups is called "cup board", and is made on special multi-ply paper machines. It has a barrier coating for waterproofing. The paper needs high stiffness and strong wet sizing. The cup board grade has a special design for the cup manufacturing processes. The mouth roll forming process requires good elongation properties of the board and the plastic coating. A well formed mouth roll provides stiffness and handling properties in the cup. The basis weights of the cup boards are 170–350 g/m^{2}.

To meet hygiene requirements, paper cups are generally manufactured from virgin (non-recycled) materials. The one exception to this is when the paper cup features an extra insulating layer for heat retention, which never comes into contact with the beverage, such as a corrugated layer wrapped around a single-wall cup.

=== Waterproofing ===
Originally, paper cups for hot drinks were glued together and made waterproof by dropping a small amount of clay in the bottom of the cup, and then spinning at high speed so that clay would travel up the walls of the cup, making the paper water-resistant. However, this resulted in drinks smelling and tasting of cardboard.

Cups for cold drinks could not be treated in the same way, as condensation forms on the outside, then soaks into the board, making the cup unstable. To remedy this, cup manufacturers developed the technique of spraying both the inside and outside of the cup with wax. Clay and wax-coated cups disappeared with the invention of polyethylene (PE)-coated cups; this process covers the surface of the board with a very thin layer of PE, waterproofing the board and welding the seams together.

In 2017, the Finnish board manufacturer Kotkamills launched a new kind of cup (food service) board which uses no wax or plastic for waterproofing, and thus can be recycled as part of the normal paper and board waste stream, biodegraded, or even composted in small quantities.

In 2017, the Newport Beach, California, company Smart Planet Technologies, launched "reCUP" for the UK market, a recyclable paper cup using a polyethylene and mineral-blended coating branded EarthCoating, that is engineered to be recycled through traditional paper recycling systems. Paper cups with EarthCoating are sold by Detpak, Huhtamaki, Linstol, and Pureco USA.

Paper cups and paper bags made from "Pinyapel", paper made from discarded pineapple leaves, were introduced in 2019. The water-resistant food packaging alternative material was developed by a consortium made up of the Department of Trade and Industry Design Center of the Philippines (DCP), Cagayan de Oro Handmade Paper, Nature's Fresh, and Ideatechs Packaging Corporation. The innovation was a Wood Pencil Awardee in the 2019 edition of the annual D&AD Future Impact Awards. Tests by the DCP show that the 55.32 percent mass loss of Pinyapel in four weeks is much higher than the 21.33 percent mass loss in commercial paper bags, giving evidence that the material decomposes faster than other paper products.

=== Printing on paper cups ===
Originally paper cups were printed using rubber blocks mounted on cylinders, with a different cylinder for each colour. Registration across different colours was very difficult, but later flexography plates became available and with the use of mounting systems it became easier to register across the colours, allowing for more complex designs. Printing flexographic has become ideal for long runs and manufacturers generally use this method when producing over a million cups. Machines such as Comexi are used for this, which have been adapted to take the extra large reels that are required by paper cup manufacturers. Ink technology has also changed and where solvent-based inks were being used, water-based inks are instead being utilised. One of the side effects of solvent-based inks is that hot drink cups in particular can smell of solvent, whereas water-based inks have eliminated this problem.

Other methods of printing have been used for short runs such as offset printing, which can vary within a range from 10,000 to 100,000 cups. Offset printing inks have also been developed and although in the past these were solvent based, the latest soya-based inks have reduced the danger of cups smelling. The latest development is Direct-printing, which allows printing on very small quantities, typically from 1,000 cups, and is used by companies including Brendos Ltd offering small quantities in short lead times. Rotogravure can also be used, but this is extremely expensive and is normally only utilised for items requiring extremely high quality printing like ice cream containers.

== Environmental impact ==
=== Recycling ===
Most paper cups are designed for a single use and then disposal. Very little recycled paper is used to make paper cups because of contamination concerns and regulations. Since most paper cups are coated with plastic (polyethylene), then both composting and recycling of paper cups is uncommon because of the difficulty in separating the polyethylene in the recycling process of said cups. The recyclability of paper cups is often limited because the paper fibers must be separated from plastic or polymer coatings during processing, making recovery more complex than conventional paper recycling. As of 2016, there are only two facilities in the UK able to properly recycle PE-coated cups; in the absence of such facilities, the cups are taken to landfill or incinerated.

A UK-based business group James Cropper have developed the world's first facility for the effective recycling of the estimated 2.5 billion paper coffee cups used and disposed of by British businesses each year, and have become one of 14 international companies to formally join the Paper Recovery and Recycling Group (PCRRG).

James Cropper's Reclaimed Fibre Facility was opened by HM The Queen in July 2013, and recovers both the plastic and paper from the cups; ensuring nothing is wasted from the recycling process. Although paper cups are made from renewable resources (wood chips 95% by weight), paper products in a landfill might not decompose, or can release methane, if decomposed anaerobically.

A US company, Smart Planet Technologies has developed a new coating on paper cups and folding cartons called EarthCoating so they are certified universally recyclable in conventional paper recycling systems. Paper cups with EarthCoating have received the highest "AAA" rating for recycling from Der Grune Punkt (The Green Dot), a certifying body for recycling in the EU, for recycling in Class 13 bales along with office paper. Smart Planet Technologies' licensee Detpak, along with paper-shredder Shred-X have set up commercial recycling systems for paper cups with EarthCoating, branded "RecycleMe", used in recycled paper products such as copy paper, gift wrap, and paper bags. Detpak declared the takeaway cup problem solved in Australia. Subsequently, Australia's Department of Defense, along with globally-recognized recycler Veolia, have teamed up to recycle the department's paper cups, as part of their "War on Waste".

In 2017, the Finnish board manufacturer Kotkamills launched a new kind of cup (food service) board which uses no wax or plastic for waterproofing, and thus can be recycled as part of the normal paper and board waste stream, biodegraded, or even composted in small quantities.

The manufacture of paper usually requires inorganic chemicals and creates water effluents. Paper cups may consume more non-renewable resources than cups made of polystyrene foam (whose only significant effluent is pentane).

=== Paper vs plastic ===
A life cycle inventory of a comparison of paper vs plastic cups shows environmental effects of both with no clear winner.

Polyethylene (PE) is a petroleum-based coating on paper cups that can slow down the process of biodegrading of the paper it coats.

Polylactic acid (PLA) is a biodegradable bio-plastic coating used on some paper cups. PLA is a renewable resource and is certified compostable in industrial composting facilities, which means that when it biodegrades, it does not leave behind any toxic residues. Although PLA-lined cups are the only paper cups which can be composted fully, they can contaminate the waste stream, reportedly making other recycled plastics unsaleable.

A number of cities — including Portland, Oregon — have banned XPS foam cups in take-out and fast food restaurants.

=== Emissions ===
A study of one paper coffee cup with sleeve (16 ounce / 500 ml) shows that the level of CO_{2} emissions is about 0.253 kilograms (0.56 lb) per cup with sleeve – including paper from trees, materials, production, and shipping.

=== Habitat-loss trees used ===
The habitat loss from one 16 ounce paper coffee cup with a sleeve is estimated to be 0.09 square meters (0.93 square feet). Over 6.5 million trees were cut down to make 16 billion paper coffee cups used by U.S. in 2006, using 4 billion US gallons (15,000,000 m^{3}) of water and resulting in 253 million pounds (115,000,000 kg) of waste. Overall, US Americans use 58% of all paper cups worldwide, amounting to 130 billion cups.

== Lids ==
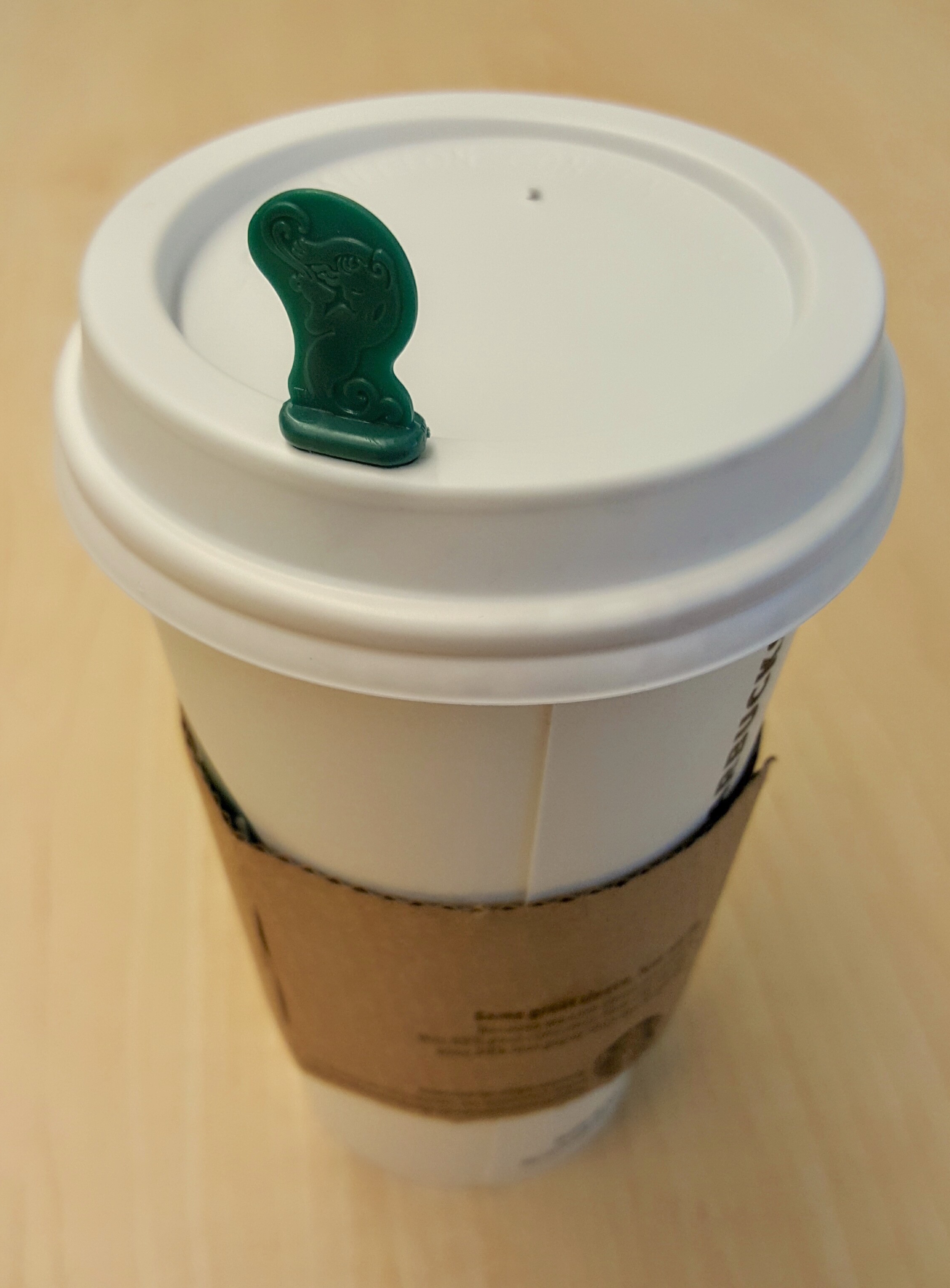
A paper coffee cup with a plastic lid and "splash stick"

Paper cups may have various types of lids. The paper cups that are used as containers for yogurt, for example, generally have two types of lids: heat-seal foil lids used for small "single serving" containers, and 150–200 ml (5–7 US fl oz) plastic press-on, resealable lids used for large "family size" containers, 250–1,000 ml (8–30 US fl oz), where not all of the yogurt may be consumed at any one time and thus the ability to re-close the container is required.

Hot drinks sold in paper cups may come with a plastic lid, to keep the drink hot and prevent spillage. These lids have a hole through which the drink can be sipped. The plastic lids can have many features including peel back tabs, raised walls to protect the foam of gourmet hot drinks and embossed text. In 2008, Starbucks introduced shaped plastic "splash sticks" to block the hole, in some of their stores, after customer complaints about hot coffee splashing through it.

== Bibliography ==
- Allyn Freeman & Bob Golden (1997). "Little Dipper". Why Didn't I Think of That? : Bizarre Origins of Ingenious Inventions We Couldn't Live Without. John Wiley and Sons. pp. 183–184. ISBN 978-0-471-16511-8. – the Dixie Cup
- Maying Soong (2002). Chinese Paper Folding for Beginners. Courier Dover Publications. pp. 6–7. ISBN 978-0-486-41806-3. – how to make a paper cup out of a square of paper using origami
- Martin B. Hocking (November 1991). "Relative merits of polystyrene foam and paper in hot drink cups: Implications for packaging". Environmental Management. 15 (6). Springer New York: 731–747. Bibcode:1991EnMan..15..731H. doi:10.1007/BF02394812. S2CID 137050319.
- Martin B. Hocking (November 1994). "Reusable and disposable cups: An energy-based evaluation". Environmental Management. 18 (6). Springer New York: 889–899. Bibcode:1994EnMan..18..889H. doi:10.1007/BF02393618. S2CID 30427571.
- A mathematically annotated folding instruction for paper cups
