= Comexi Group =

Spanish machinery supplier

- Type: Private
- Industry: Flexible Packaging
- Founded: Girona, Spain (1954)
- Headquarters: Girona, Spain
- Key people: Jeroen van der Meer, CEO
- Number of employees: 510 (2017)
- Website: www.comexi.com

Comexi Group is a machinery supplier in the flexible packaging industry. Family-run company that started its activities in 1954, now it is an industrial global supplier with more than 500 employees and 2 factories: one in Spain, near Barcelona and another one located in Rio Grande do Sul in Brazil.

In its beginnings, the company was divided in flexographic presses (Flexo Brand), solvent, solventless lamination and coating (Nexus Brand), slitting and rewinding (Proslit Brand) and logistics and environmental management for its industry (Enviroxi Brand). Nowadays, the company is organized in 4 product lines: flexographic printing, offset printing, laminating and slitting. Besides, internally is based around Business Units for each 4 technological and product lines.

Comexi is a supplier of machinery and services to the flexible packaging converting industry, with a degree of specialization in each of its product lines. Besides, in 2013 created Manel Xifra Boada Technological Centre, Comexi CTec, from where the company provides knowledge to the companies and agents involved in the printing and converting industry. This center offers Innovation services, Consultancy services, Training services and has a Demo Centre.

== History ==
In the life of Comexi Group, the spaces are specific ones and they are important and enable us to explain the story of the company at four different moments in time: Carrer Taquígraf Martí in the Vista Alegre district (1954–1957) was its origin; Plaça Balmes in Santa Eugènia de Ter (1957–1961) was its consolidation;

Avinguda Sant Narcís in the Sant Narcís district and the plant in Carretera Barcelona (1982–1998) were its expansion; the plant in Riudellots de la Selva in the industrial estate Polingesa1 (from 1998) represents the internationalisation of the brand names and a multinational culture. The Comexi Group factory in Brazil (2002) is a clear example of this, the flagship of the new times.

2010: Comexi join CEQUIP Foundation.

== Manel Xifra & Boada Awards ==
Comexi Group created the Manel Xifra & Boada Awards to recognize engineering as a diffused, consolidated and distinct profession. They are established in 3 categories: Best Professional Career, Transmission of Scientific and Technical Knowledge, and the Best Final University Project acknowledgment given by the Polytechnic Superior School of the UdG.

== Headquarters ==
In 1999, Comexi Group decided to modernise its facilities and establish a new site for the group's headquarters. It purchased over 100,000 square metres of land for this purpose in Riudellots de la Selva, just six kilometres from Girona (Spain). Riudellots, with its new airport now consolidated, has become one of the fastest-growing hubs of technology and business growth in Europe.

== Comexi in the world ==
Comexi has 2 production plants located in Spain and Brazil. A part from that, Comexi North America offers a technical and demo center along with a Service Hub and a spare parts warehouse in Miami, Florida USA. Comexi also offers immediate 24/7 technical service assistance worldwide. The company has a sales network spread in more than 100 countries from all around the world.
