= Plastic cup =

Container made of plastic

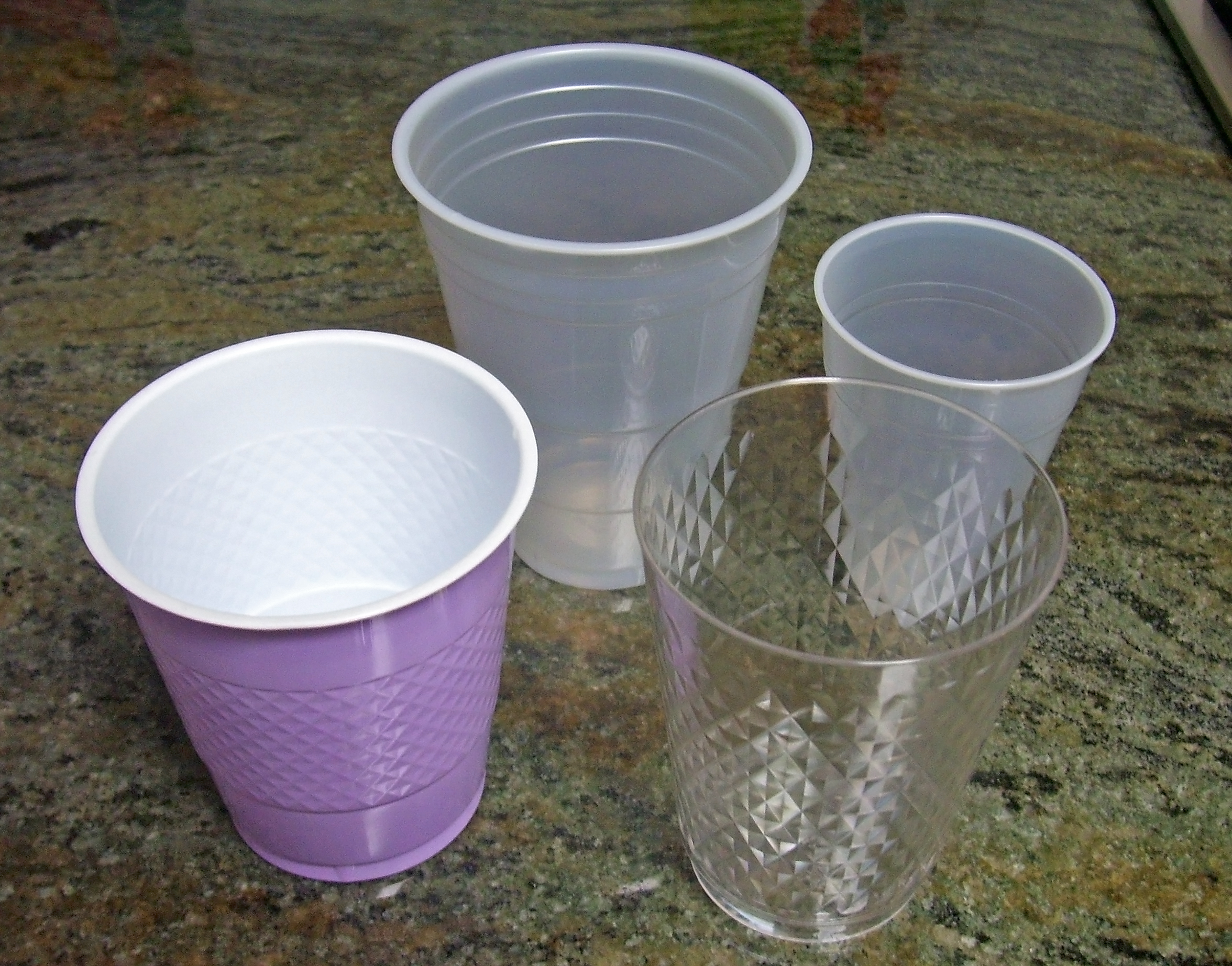
Assorted plastic cups

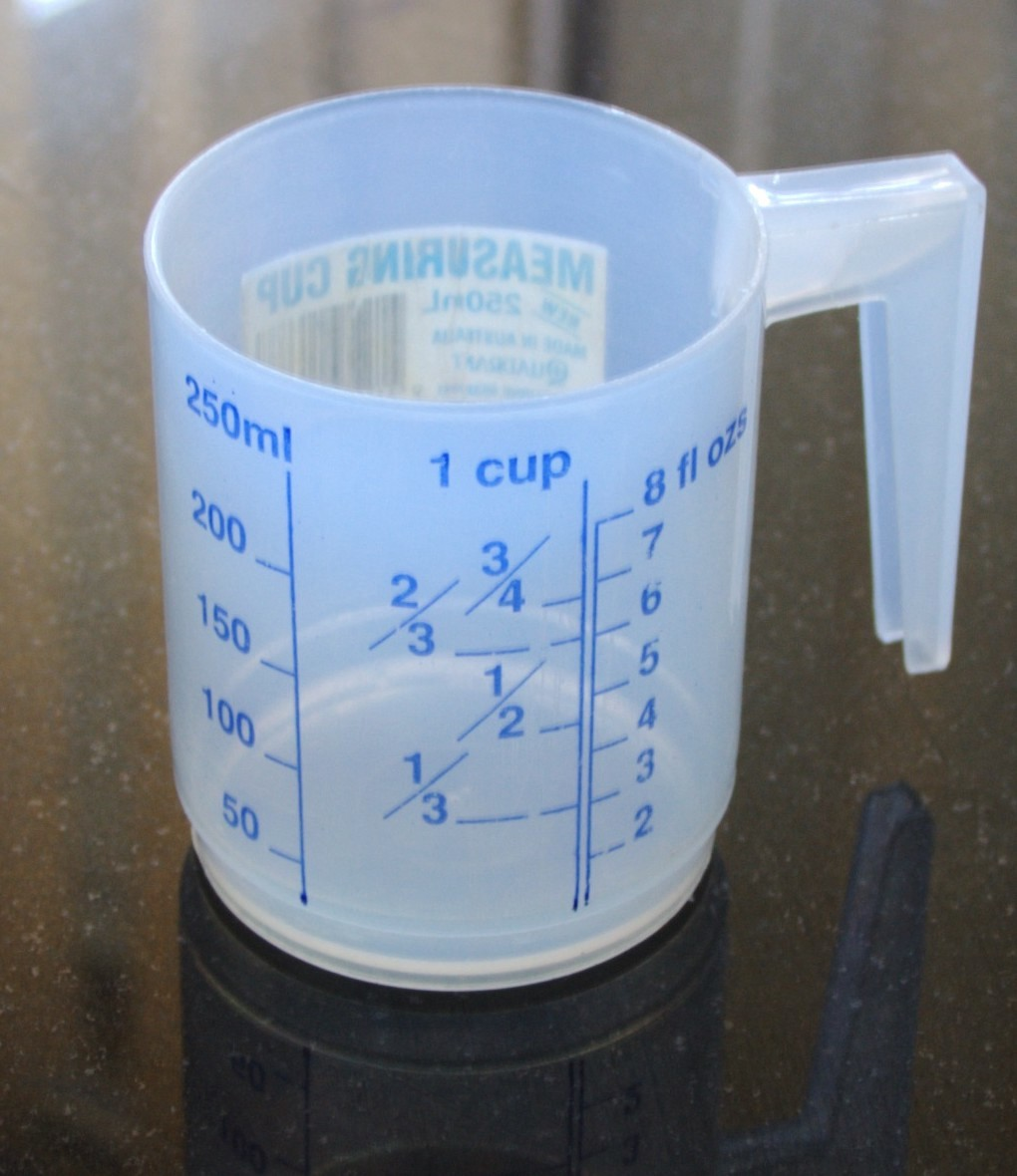
A plastic measuring cup

A plastic cup is a cup made out of plastic, commonly used as a container to hold beverages. Some are reusable while others are intended for a single use followed by recycling or disposal.

Disposable plastic cups are often used for gatherings where it would be inconvenient to wash dishes afterward, due to factors such as location or number of guests. Plastic cups can be used for storing most liquids, but hot liquids may melt or warp the material. A common design in the United States is a red plastic cup, often used for serving alcoholic beverages.

Non-disposable plastic cups are commonly used for children. This is in case they could drop them. Plastic is usually preferred for this purpose due to its sturdy qualities. In contrast, glass is easily broken, so if a child were to drop it, it would shatter instantly, unlike plastic, which when dropped tends to simply bounce.

== Environmental issues ==
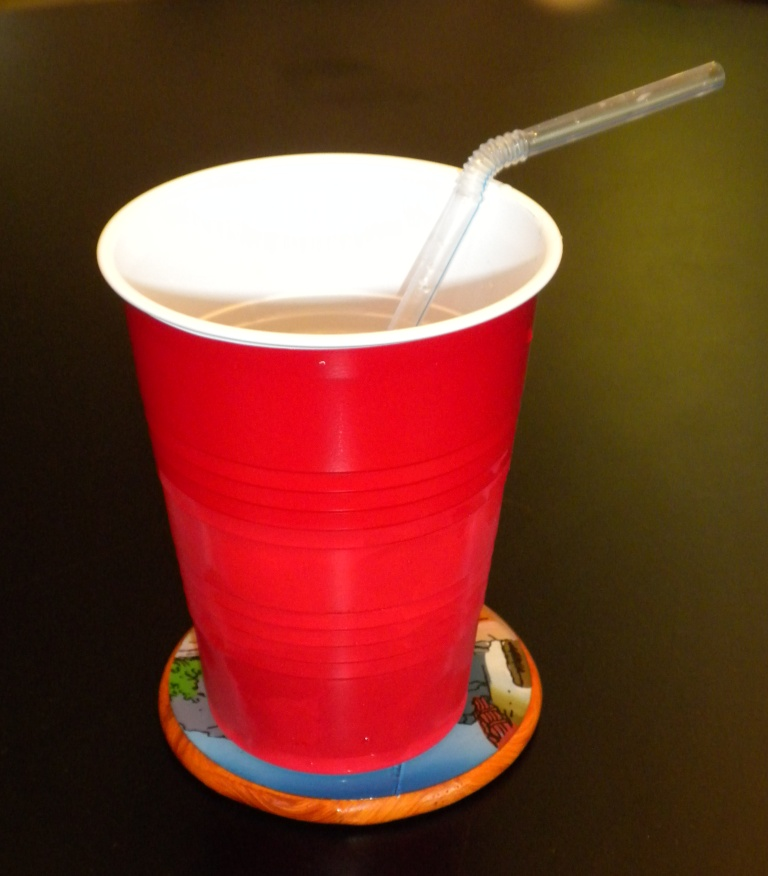
A single-use red plastic cup with a drinking straw

Most plastic cups are designed for single uses and then disposal or recycling. A life cycle inventory of a comparison of paper and plastic shows environmental effects of both with no clear winner.

Production of 1 tonne (0.98 long tons; 1.1 short tons) of plastic cup emits 135 pounds (61 kg) of green house gases.

The choice between paper cups and plastic cups has to do with the life of the item after use. A paper cup may biodegrade faster than an expanded polystyrene (EPS) foam cup or a plastic cup. In general cardboard or paper takes one to three months for biodegradation, as the majority of the content, up to 95%, is made with wood chips. A plastic cup can take up to 90 years to biodegrade, depending on the type of plastic.

Plastic cups are made with oil, which is not a renewable source. On the other hand, paper cups can be sourced from forests which fall under sustainable management.

Plastic cups, especially those made with polystyrene, are also a possible health hazard as chemicals may leach into the beverage. This is more likely to happen with warm drinks (hot chocolate, tea and coffee) than with cold drinks.

== See also ==
- Coffee cup
- Cup holder
- Paper cup
- Polylactic acid (used in making decomposable plastic cups)
