= Coated paper =

Paper coated with a compound or polymer

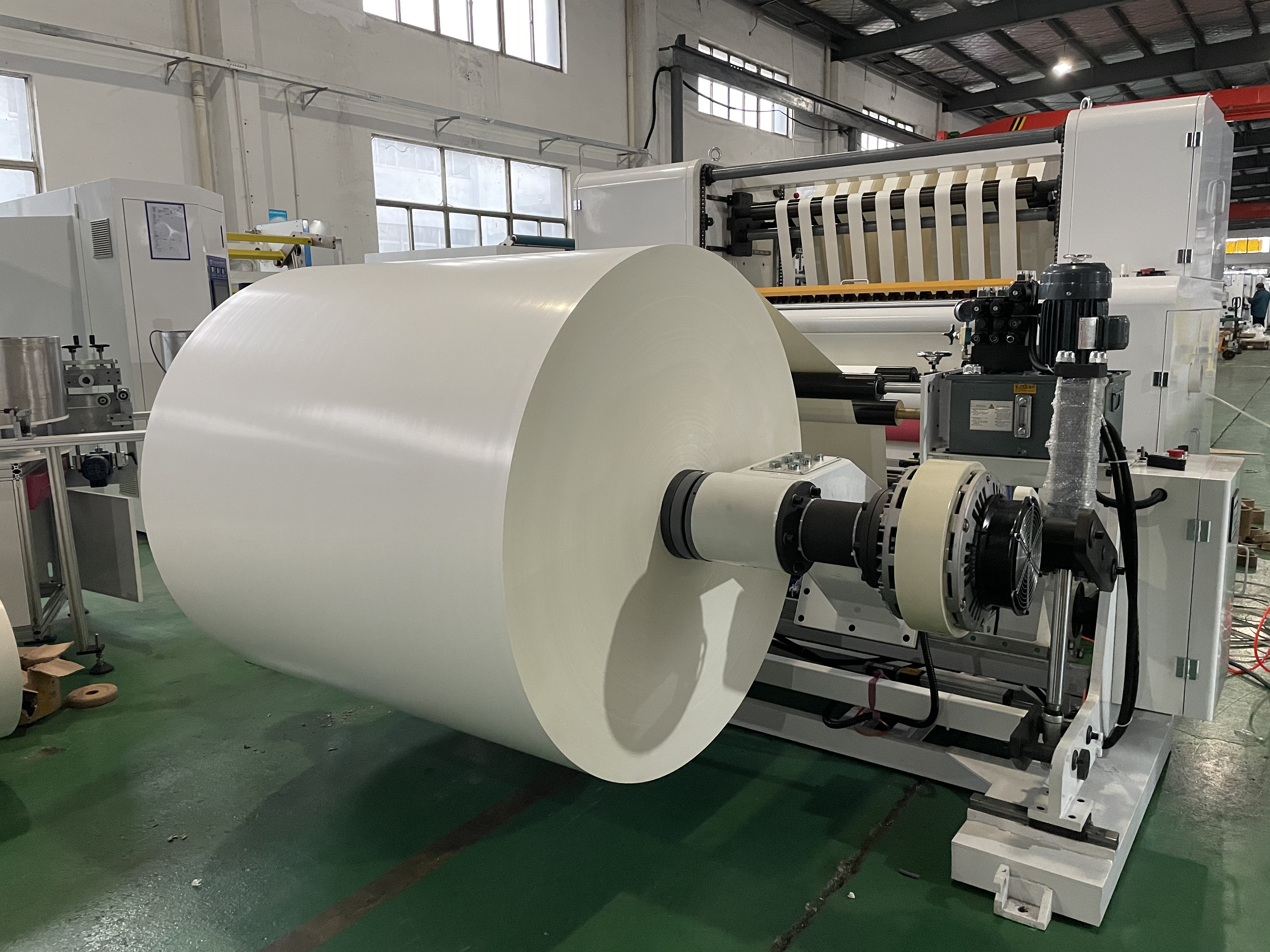
A large roll of polyethylene coated paper

Coated paper (also known as enamel paper, gloss paper, and thin paper) is paper that has been coated with a mixture of materials or a polymer to impart certain qualities to the paper, including weight, surface gloss, smoothness, or reduced ink absorbency. Various materials, including kaolinite, calcium carbonate, bentonite, and talc, can be used to coat paper for high-quality printing, such as that used in the packaging industry and in magazines.

The chalk or china clay is bound to the paper with synthetic viscosifiers, such as styrene-butadiene latexes and natural organic binders such as starch. The coating formulation may also contain chemical additives as dispersants, resins, or polyethylene to give water resistance and wet strength to the paper, or to protect against ultraviolet radiation.

Coated papers have been traditionally used for printing magazines.

== History ==
Waterproof paper was described in Scientific American in 1884.

== Varieties ==
=== Machine-finished coated paper ===
Machine-finished coated paper (MFC) has a basis weight of 48–80 g/m^{2}. They have good surface properties, high print gloss and adequate sheet stiffness. MFC papers are made of 60–85% groundwood or thermomechanical pulp (TMP) and 15–40% chemical pulp with a total pigment content of 20–30%. The paper can be soft nip calendered or supercalendered. These are often used in paperbacks.

=== Coated fine paper ===
Coated fine paper or woodfree coated paper (WFC) are primarily produced for offset printing:

Standard coated fine papers
This paper quality is normally used for advertising materials, books, annual reports and high-quality catalogs. Grammage ranges from 90–170 g/m^{2} and ISO brightness between 80–96%. The fibre furnish consists of more than 90% chemical pulp. Total pigment content are in the range 30–45%, where calcium carbonate and clay are the most common.
Low coat weight papers
These paper grades have lower coat weights than the standard WFC (3–14 g/m^{2}/side) and the grammage and pigment content are also generally lower, 55–135 g/m^{2} and 20–35% respectively.
Art papers
Art papers are one of the highest-quality printing papers and are used for illustrated books, calendars and brochures. The grammage varies from 100 to 230 g/m^{2}. These paper grades are triple coated with 20–40 g/m^{2}/side and have matte or glossy finish. Higher qualities often contain cotton.

=== Plastic coatings ===
Plastic-coated paper includes coatings such as polyethylene or polyolefin extrusion, silicone, and wax, commonly used in products like paper cups and photographic paper. Biopolymer coatings are available as more sustainable alternatives to common petrochemical coatings like low-density polyethylene (LDPE) or mylar. It is most used in the food and drink packaging industry.

Plastic is used to enhance properties such as water resistance, tear strength, abrasion resistance, and heat sealability, etc. Some papers are laminated by heat or adhesive to a plastic film to provide barrier properties in use. Other papers are coated with a melted plastic layer: curtain coating is one common method. Printed papers commonly have a top coat of a protective polymer to seal the print, provide scuff resistance, and sometimes gloss. Some coatings are processed by UV curing for stability.

Most plastic coatings in the packaging industry are polyethylene (LDPE) and to a much lesser degree PET. Liquid packaging board cartons typically contain 74% paper, 22% plastic and 4% aluminum. Frozen food cartons are usually made up of an 80% paper and 20% plastic combination.

The most notable applications for plastic-coated paper are single use (disposable food packaging):

- Liquid packaging board for milk and juice folding cartons
- Hot and cold paper cups
- Paper plates
- Frozen food containers
- Plastic-lined paper bags
- Take-out containers
- Waterproof paper (also multi-use)
- Heat sealable paper
- Barrier packaging

Plastic coatings or layers usually make paper recycling more difficult. Some plastic laminations can be separated from the paper during the recycling process, allowing filtering out the film. If the coated paper is shredded prior to recycling, the degree of separation depends on the particular process. Some plastic coatings are water dispersible to aid recycling and repulping. Special recycling processes are available to help separate plastics. Some plastic coated papers are incinerated for heat or landfilled rather than recycled.

Most plastic coated papers are not suited to composting, but do variously end up in compost bins, sometimes even legally so. In this case, the remains of the non-biodegradable plastics components form part of the global microplastics waste problem.

=== Imitation parchment and vellum paper ===
Imitation parchment paper and vellum paper (Note: a.k.a. vegetable vellum, Japanese vellum) are coated papers intended to replicate the texture and handling of parchment and vellum respectively.

Paper vellum is usually translucent and its various sizes are often used as tracing paper, such as architectural plans. Its dimensions are more stable than a linen or paper sheet, which is frequently critical in the development of large scaled drawings such as blueprints. Paper vellum has also become extremely important in hand or chemical reproduction technology for dissemination of plan copies. Like a high-quality traditional vellum, paper vellum could be produced thin enough to be virtually transparent to strong light, enabling a source drawing to be used directly in the reproduction of field-used drawings.

=== Others ===
In commercial printing and other graphic-arts applications, printed sheets may receive a protective overprint coating—often a water-based aqueous coating—or a UV coating (processed by UV curing for stability), to seal the print, improve rub/scuff resistance, and control surface sheen. Aqueous coatings are commonly offered in gloss, satin, matte, and soft-touch finishes.

A release liner is a paper (or film) sheet used to prevent a sticky surface from adhering. It is coated on one or both sides with a release agent.

Heat printed papers such as receipts are coated with a chemical mixture, which often contains endocrine disrupting and carcinogenic compounds, such as bisphenol A (BPA). It is possible to check whether a piece of paper is thermographically coated, as it will turn black from friction or heat. (see Thermal paper)

Paper labels are often coated with adhesive (pressure sensitive or gummed) on one side and coated with printing or graphics on the other.

== See also ==
- Inkjet paper – Paper designed for use with inkjet printers
- Paperboard – Thick paper-based material
- Waxed paper – Treated type of paper
- Printing
