= Robert Leo Hulseman =

American businessman (1932–2016), inventor of the Solo cup

Hulseman's invention, the red Solo cup

Robert Leo Hulseman (April 5, 1932 – December 21, 2016) was an American businessman and entrepreneur who was best known as the inventor of the red Solo cup, which is produced by his family's company, the Solo Cup Company. He also co-designed the Traveler Lid, which prevents foam from hot beverages such as lattes and cappuccinos from touching the drinker's nose, widely used by Starbucks and other brands. Hulseman joined the staff of the Solo Cup Company, which had been founded in 1936 by his father Leo Hulseman, when he was 18 years old. Hulseman spent more than 60 years at the Solo Cup Company, including as the company's President and CEO from 1980 until 2006.

Hulseman developed and introduced the red Solo cup, which has been a crucial product of the Solo Cup Company and a part of everyday life for many Americans. The cup became an icon of college and tailgate parties and an essential element in popular drinking games, including beer pong. The red cup was further popularized by Toby Keith's 2011 song "Red Solo Cup".

== Biography ==
=== Early and personal life ===
Hulseman was born in Chicago, Illinois, on April 5, 1932. His mother Dorothy (née Hall) was a singer known by the stage name Dora Hall, while his father, Leo Hulseman, established the Solo Cup Company, a manufacturer of disposable cups, bowls and plates, in 1936. Robert Hulseman survived polio as a teenager, which affected the left side of his body and caused one of his legs to be shorter than the other. This was surgically corrected.

Hulseman met his wife, Sheila, with whom he had ten children, while they were students at Marquette University. He also briefly served in the United States Army.

=== Career ===
Hulseman's father Leo, a former Dixie Cup employee, founded the Solo Cup Company in 1936. Robert Hulseman joined the company around 1950 when he was 18, starting as a factory worker and working through a series of positions.

Hulseman later developed the Solo Cup Company's plastic business, and created the plastic Solo cup during the mid 1970s. He used his family as a focus group, placing small plastic cups of varying colors (blue, red, peach, and yellow) on the kitchen table for his kids to peruse. Red Solo cups proved popular with both Hulseman's children and consumers, whereas the peach cups were not popular. Hulseman personally preferred color blue.

Husleman initially launched the red Solo cups in smaller 5, 7 and 9 ounce sizes before later introducing the iconic 16 ounce red Solo cup, which proved to be the most popular size long term. When the 16 ounce cups were introduced, few consumers drank beers that size, but consumer tastes changed. Today, the plastic Solo cups are manufactured in dozens of colors, but the red Solo cups remain the company's best seller.

Hulseman became president of the Solo Cup Company in 1980, succeeding his father. He later became the company's CEO as well.

In 1986, Hulseman and his employee, Jack Clements, developed the Traveler Lid for use on coffee cups and other hot beverage containers. The Traveler Lid provides space for foam or whipped cream for hot drinks, such as cappuccinos and lattes, and prevents the foam from reaching the consumer's nose. While both Clements and Hulseman designed the lid, Clements retains the rights to its patent. The Museum of Modern Art (MoMA) in New York City honored the Traveler Lid as part of its 122 "Humble Masterpieces" of design exhibition in 2004.

He retired as CEO in 2006, two years after the family company had acquired rival Sweetheart Cup Company, another manufacturer of disposable cups.

The Solo Cup Company was acquired by the Dart Container Corporation in 2012.

Hulseman was also a devout Catholic and a philanthropist, known to support anti-poverty initiatives and Catholic schools. He and his family attended Mass weekly at Saints Faith, Hope and Charity Roman Catholic Church in Winnetka, Illinois.

Hulseman's health deteriorated during his later years following a series of strokes. He died from stroke complications at his home in Northfield, Illinois, on December 21, 2016, at the age of 84. He was survived by nine children and 30 grandchildren. His wife, Sheila, whom he had been married to for 60 years, died in August 2015 and one of his children, Jean Hulseman Kloos, died in August 2016. Country singer Toby Keith paid tribute to Hulseman on Twitter following his death, writing, "Raise one for this good man today."
