= Robert Egan (disambiguation) =

Robert Egan (born 1958) is an American restaurateur and an interlocutor between North Korea and the United States.

Robert Egan may also refer to:

- Robert Egan (footballer), Republic of Ireland international footballer
- Robert J. Egan (Michigan politician), mayor of Flint
- Robert J. Egan (Illinois politician) (1931–2002), American politician, lawyer, and judge
- Robert Shaw Egan, botanist and lichenologist
