= Sunset Ridge School District 29 =

School district in Illinois, United States

Address
- 525 Sunset Ridge Rd Northfield, Cook County, Illinois, 60093-1025; United States

District information
- Type: Primary
- Grades: K-8
- Superintendent: James Eichmiller
- School board: 7
- Schools: 2
- NCES District ID: 1738400
- District ID: IL-05-016-0290-02

Students and staff
- Students: 490
- Faculty: 55.60 (on an FTE basis)
- Student–teacher ratio: 8.81:1

Other information
- Website: www.sunsetridge29.org

Sunset Ridge School District 29 is an elementary school district in Northfield, Illinois. This district feeds into New Trier High School in Northfield and Winnetka, Illinois.

== Sunset Ridge School ==
Sunset Ridge School, a 4th-8th grade school, is a new school that was built and finished in 2018 and is the first LEED Platinum Public Elementary School in Illinois. It has an average graduating class of 60 to 80 students. Sunset Ridge has been consistently rated as one of the top public schools in the State of Illinois. The school mascot is the Eagle. The principal is currently Ivy Sukenik.

== Middlefork School ==
The district's K-3rd grade school is Middlefork School. Its mascot is the Dolphin.
