= Northfield, Illinois =

Village in Illinois, United States

- Village
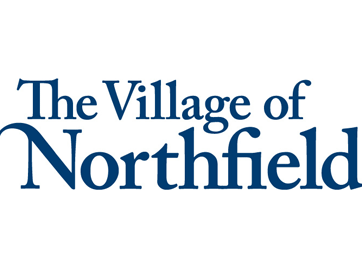
- logo
- Motto: The comfortable corner of the North Shore
- Location of Northfield in Cook County, Illinois.

- Location within Greater Chicago Location within Illinois Location within the United States
- Coordinates: 42°6′N 87°46′W
- Country: United States
- State: Illinois
- County: Cook

Area
  - Total: 3.23 sq mi (8.37 km^{2})
  - Land: 3.23 sq mi (8.37 km^{2})
  - Water: 0 sq mi (0.00 km^{2})

Population (2020)
  - Total: 5,751
  - Density: 1,780.5/sq mi (687.44/km^{2})
- Time zone: UTC-6 (CST)
  - Summer (DST): UTC-5 (CDT)
- ZIP Codes: 60063, 60093
- Area codes: 847 and 224
- FIPS code: 17-53663
- Website: www.northfieldil.org

Northfield is a village in Cook County, Illinois, United States, located approximately 19 miles (31 km) north of downtown Chicago. As of the 2020 census, the village's population was 5,751. It is part of a collection of upscale residential communities north of Chicago that belong to New Trier and Northfield Townships and the greater North Shore.

== Geography ==
Northfield is located in Northfield Township, Cook County at 42°6'N 87°46'W (42.10,-87.77).

According to the 2021 census gazetteer files, Northfield has a total area of 3.23 square miles (8.37 km^{2}), all land.

== Demographics ==
Historical population
Census	Pop.	Note	%±
1930	311		—
1940	739		137.6%
1950	1,426		93.0%
1960	4,005		180.9%
1970	5,010		25.1%
1980	4,887		−2.5%
1990	4,635		−5.2%
2000	5,389		16.3%
2010	5,420		0.6%
2020	5,751		6.1%
U.S. Decennial Census; 2010 2020

=== Racial and ethnic composition ===
Northfield village, Illinois – Racial and ethnic composition Note: the US Census treats Hispanic/Latino as an ethnic category. This table excludes Latinos from the racial categories and assigns them to a separate category. Hispanics/Latinos may be of any race.
Race / Ethnicity (NH = Non-Hispanic)	Pop 2000	Pop 2010	Pop 2020	% 2000	% 2010	% 2020
White alone (NH)	4,917	4,824	4,706	91.24%	89.00%	81.83%
Black or African American alone (NH)	27	26	25	0.50%	0.48%	0.43%
Native American or Alaska Native alone (NH)	2	2	1	0.04%	0.04%	0.02%
Asian alone (NH)	300	364	529	5.57%	6.72%	9.20%
Pacific Islander alone (NH)	0	2	0	0.00%	0.04%	0.00%
Other race alone (NH)	6	7	7	0.11%	0.13%	0.12%
Mixed race or Multiracial (NH)	47	36	205	0.87%	0.66%	3.56%
Hispanic or Latino (any race)	90	159	278	1.67%	2.93%	4.83%
Total	5,389	5,420	5,751	100.00%	100.00%	100.00%

=== 2020 census ===
As of the 2020 census, Northfield had a population of 5,751 and 1,710 families. The population density was 1,780.50 inhabitants per square mile (687.45/km^{2}), and there were 2,420 housing units at an average density of 749.23 per square mile (289.28/km^{2}).

The median age was 48.8 years. 22.8% of residents were under the age of 18 and 24.2% of residents were 65 years of age or older. For every 100 females there were 89.9 males, and for every 100 females age 18 and over there were 86.7 males age 18 and over.

100.0% of residents lived in urban areas, while 0.0% lived in rural areas.

There were 2,263 households in Northfield, of which 31.3% had children under the age of 18 living in them. Of all households, 59.8% were married-couple households, 11.5% were households with a male householder and no spouse or partner present, and 25.7% were households with a female householder and no spouse or partner present. About 25.8% of all households were made up of individuals and 16.3% had someone living alone who was 65 years of age or older.

There were 2,420 housing units, of which 6.5% were vacant. The homeowner vacancy rate was 1.7% and the rental vacancy rate was 4.3%.

=== Income and poverty ===
The median income for a household in the village was $143,661, and the median income for a family was $200,132. Males had a median income of $89,089 versus $56,364 for females. The per capita income for the village was $103,893. About 8.7% of families and 8.3% of the population were below the poverty line, including 14.6% of those under age 18 and 4.7% of those age 65 or over.

== Government ==
Northfield is represented by Democrat Jan Schakowsky of Illinois's 9th congressional district in the United States House of Representatives, Democrat Tammy Duckworth and Democrat Dick Durbin in the United States Senate, State Representative Robyn Gabel, State Senator Laura Fine and Northfield Village President Greg Lungmus.

== Education ==
Northfield is home to New Trier High School's freshman campus.

Northfield houses Middlefork (K–3) and Sunset Ridge School (4–8). It shares its ZIP code (60093) with Winnetka. The high school is New Trier High School.

A small part of Northfield (east of the former Chicago and Northwestern train tracks) is served by Avoca School District 37 in Wilmette. An even smaller part (south of Winnetka Avenue between Sunset Ridge Road and the Forest Preserve) is served by Glenview School District 34 in Glenview.

Christian Heritage Academy is a private school in Northfield that serves students in preschool through twelfth grade. It offers a Christian-based education.

Northfield is also home to Glenview Montessori School, a fully accredited, non-sectarian school for 2-6 year olds. The Glenview Montessori School is part of the Deerfield Montessori Schools, one of the first Montessori schools established in Illinois.

Saint Louise de Marillac High School was an all-girls Catholic secondary school in Northfield from 1967 to 1994, run by the Daughters of Charity. In 1994, Marillac merged with Loyola Academy. The campus was sold to Christian Heritage Academy.

The local Catholic parish, St. Phillip the Apostle, ran an elementary school which closed in 2004. The facility is currently leased by the Hyde Park Day School, a University of Chicago laboratory school for students with learning disabilities.

== Public safety ==
=== Northfield Fire-Rescue Department ===
The Northfield Fire-Rescue Department, headed by Chief Michael Nystrand, is a combination department. They respond to fire related emergencies, medical emergencies, and specialized rescue situations. The department operates out of one station, centrally located at 1800 Winnetka Avenue. The Northfield Fire Rescue Department's Paramedic program is overseen by Saint Francis Hospital in Evanston, as part of Illinois EMS Region X.

=== Northfield Police Department ===
The Northfield Police Department, headed by Chief William Lustig, is responsible for all law enforcement operations in Northfield as well as emergency communications (E-911) for the Village. The police department, operated out of one station within the city hall complex, is well known for professionalism and good community relations. This department is Accredited by CALEA, and was one of the first in the State of Illinois to become so accredited.

== Economy ==
The headquarters of Kraft Foods was formerly located in Northfield. Medline Industries now occupies Kraft's former office location. The Stepan Company, a manufacturer of specialty chemicals, is also headquartered in Northfield.

=== Top employers ===
According to Northfield's 2023 Annual Comprehensive Financial Report, the top employers in the city are:

	Employer	# of Employees
1	Medline Industries	1,300
2	New Trier High School District No. 203	573
3	College of American Pathologists	460
4	Keller Group, Inc	350
5	Bodine Electric Company	250
6	Kraft Heinz Foods Company	225
7	Sunset Ridge Country Club	120
8	Fields Auto Group	88
9	Excelsior Medical, LLC	83
10	Applicare Products, LLC	72

== Transportation ==
Pace provides bus service on multiple routes connecting Northfield to destinations across the region.

== Notable residents ==
- Lance Briggs, linebacker in the National Football League; former resident
- Stephen Calk (born 1965), banker, economic advisor to Donald Trump's 2016 presidential campaign, and convicted felon. He was a resident of Northfield until his incarceration.
- Tyson Chandler, center in the national basketball association; former resident
- Chief Keef, rapper, singer, songwriter, and record producer; former resident
- Luke Donald, professional golfer and former Northfield resident.
- Pat Fitzgerald, head football coach for the Michigan State Spartans
- Robert Leo Hulseman (1932–2016), inventor of the red solo cup and CEO of the Solo Cup Company from 1980 to 2006. He was a Northfield resident at the time of his death.
- Jerry Reinsdorf (born 1936), owner of the Chicago Bulls and the Chicago White Sox; he was a resident of Northfield until 2016.
