= Current Lighting Solutions =

GE subsidiary

Current Lighting Solutions, LLC
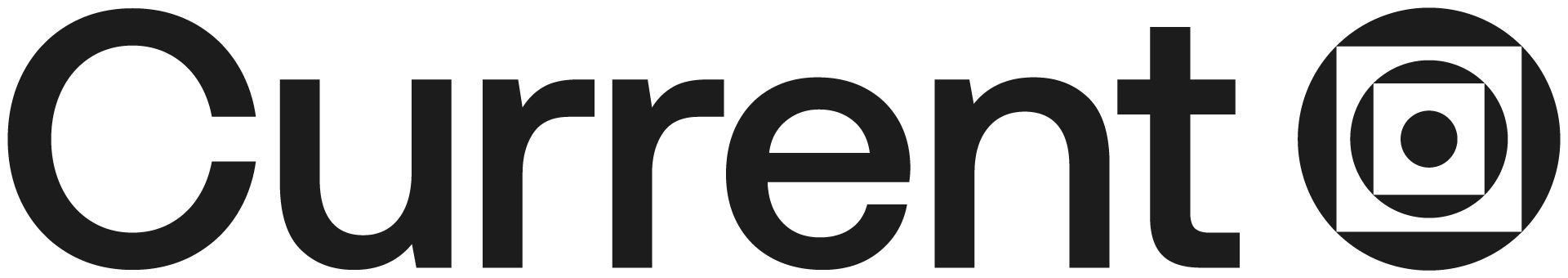
- Type: Subsidiary
- Industry: Engineering
- Founded: October 7, 2015; 10 years ago Boston, Massachusetts, U.S.
- Headquarters: Greenville, South Carolina, U.S.,
- Area served: Worldwide
- Key people: Steve Harris (CEO)
- Parent: American Industrial Partners
- Website: www.currentlighting.com

Current Lighting Solutions, LLC (formerly named Current, powered by GE and GE Current, a Daintree company) is an American company that sells energy management systems and commercial and industrial lighting. It is headquartered in Greenville, South Carolina.

== History ==
Current was established by General Electric on October 7, 2015, as a startup subsidiary. It began with more than $1 billion of revenue and expected to grow to a $5 billion business by 2020.

On April 21, 2016, Current acquired the building automation company Daintree Networks for $77 million, planning to combine Daintree's open-standard wireless network with GE's open source platform Predix to offer a new energy management system to businesses.

On November 6, 2018, GE announced that it would sell Current to the US private equity firm American Industrial Partners. Under the terms of the sale, AIP will maintain use of the GE brand. The deal was concluded in April 2019.

On June 20, 2022, the company announced that it would rebrand from GE Current to Current Lighting Solutions following the acquisition of Hubbell’s Commercial & Industrial (C&I) Lighting business. Current's HLI Brands at CurrentLighting.com were formerly part of Hubbell Lighting, while its GLI Brands at LED.com were formerly part of GE Current.

The company appointed Steve Harris as its new Chief Executive Officer, succeeding interim CEO Bill Tolley, on May 30, 2023.

== Projects ==
Current has worked or partnered with companies such as Hilton, Simon Properties, the City of San Diego, AT&T, Intel, and Qualcomm.

Within the first 5 months of its existence, Current secured the world's largest LED installation with JPMorgan Chase. Under the deal, Current will replace 1.4 million existing lights at 5,000 of JPMorgan Chase's bank branches with LED lighting. The replacement is expected to reduce the lighting-related energy used at these branches by 50 percent.

For the 2016 Summer Olympics in Rio de Janeiro, Current provided 200,000 energy-efficient lights at more than 40 Olympic venues (over 46 million square feet in total), reducing 50 percent of the energy costs.
