= Nikki Vargas =

Nikki Vargas is a Colombian-American author, travel writer and editor.

Vargas was co-founder of Unearth Women, a quarterly travel magazine that focused on women, co-author of Wanderess and author of the 2023 memoir, Call Me When You Land.

She graduated from New Trier Township High School in Winnetka, Illinois in 2006 and Indiana University Bloomington in 2010 with a degree in journalism.
