= Predix =

Predix may refer to:

- Predix (software): General Electric's software platform for the Industrial Internet
- Epix Pharmaceuticals Inc (formerly Predix Pharmaceuticals Inc.)
