= American Industrial Partners =

American private equity partnership

- Type: private company
- Industry: financial services
- Founded: April 1988; 38 years ago
- Headquarters: 450 Lexington Avenue, New York City, United States
- Area served: United States; Canada
- Key people: John Becker (Managing partner); Dino Cusumano (Managing partner); Kim Marvin (Managing partner)
- Total assets: ~US$7 billion (2019)
- Number of employees: 50 (2020)
- Website: americanindustrial.com

American Industrial Partners is an American private equity partnership. It invests in industrial businesses in the United States and Canada. It was founded in 1988 by Theodore Rogers and Richard Bingham. It has offices in New York City; the managing partners are Kim Marvin, John Becker and Dino Cusumano.

== History and acquisitions ==
American Industrial Partners was founded in 1988; according to Indianapolis News, the partnership primary consisted of CEOs who resigned following the takeovers of their companies. The partnership focused on investing in manufacturing companies. Unlike some contemporary investment firms, rather than perform leveraged buyouts, AIP claims to focus on improving the profitability of acquired companies. After acquiring companies, it would focus on "cutting debt and improving operations" while adopting a "hands-off management style" that typically retained previous leadership. Its purchases are typically financed 55% with debt, below the typical 65% to 70% of other firms. Ian Johnson of the Baltimore Sun attributed this conservative financial strategy to AIP's partners, mostly CEOs who had been unseated from their previous companies through hostile takeovers financed by debt.

AIP focused on raising a US$400 million private equity fund that would be used to invest in American manufacturing companies. By June 1993 the firm included the former CEOs of Goodyear Tire and Rubber Company, Mead Corporation, and the Stanley Works and had purchased five companies with a collective annual revenue of US$500 million.

In 1993, the firm purchased the Sweetheart Holdings, Inc., then the largest producer of disposable cups, plates, and straws in the United States, for US$445.6 million. Sweetheart had a negative net worth of US$121.9 million at the time, but after being acquired by AIP it returned to profitability and increased its net worth to US$100 million. By May 1995, however, it reported a small loss due to rising manufacturing costs. Sweetheart merged with the Fonda Group in January 1998; although AIP retained a majority of shares, Fonda Group took over control of management. Sweetheart was sold to the Solo Cup Company in December 2003. By 2004, American Industrial Partners had raised over US$1 billion in equity. AIP closed their fourth fund, valued at US$405 million, in August 2008. A fifth fund closed at US$717.5 million in December 2011.

In August 2010 the company merged Collins Industries, E-One, Halcore Group and Fleetwood Enterprises – acquired between 2007 and 2010 – to form Allied Specialty Vehicles. The company was rebranded to REV Group in November 2015 and was taken public in January 2017 with an IPO of US$275 million. The firm consolidated Heil Trailer, Kalyn Siebert, and SERVA into the holding company EnTrans International in 2014. In June 2015, it acquired Anixter's fastener business for US$380 million and rebranded it as Optimas OE Solutions.

AIP's sixth investment fund closed in September 2015 at US$1.7 billion. The firm purchased Canam Group, a Canadian steel manufacturer, for an estimated CA$875 million in 2017. Canam was sold to the Dutil family, Caisse de dépôt et placement du Québec, and the Fonds de solidarité FTQ in 2020 for an estimated CA$840 million, although AIP retained joint control of its American subsidiaries . In November 2018, General Electric (GE) sold GE Current, a manufacturer of LED lighting, to AIP for an undisclosed sum. As part of the deal, the brand retained the GE branding. AIP's seventh fund closed in April 2019 at a value of US$3 billion, its largest sum to date.

== Investments ==
Investment holdings in September 2021 were:

| Investment | Year | Company description | Ref. |
|---|---|---|---|
| Boart Longyear | 2023 | mineral exploration | |
| GD Energy Products | 2021 | industrial pumps | |
| AHF Products | 2018 | hardwood flooring | |
| Ascent Aerospace | 2012 | aerospace tooling, assembly and automation | |
| Brock Group | 2017 | industrial services | |
| Canam | 2017 | structural steel systems | |
| CR Mining | 2018 | mining productivity | |
| EnTrans International | 2011 | energy and transportation | |
| Form Technologies | 2015 | precision components | |
| GE Current | 2019 | LED lighting | |
| Crestview Aerospace | 2018 | aerospace/defense technical support | |
| Molycop | 2017 | mining consumables | |
| Optimas | 2015 | engineered fasteners | |
| Rand Logistics, Inc. | 2018 | bulk freight | |
| REV Group | 2008 | specialty vehicles | |
| Shape Technologies | 2013 | waterjets | |
| The Carlstar Group | 2013 | tires and wheels | |
| Vertex Aerospace | 2018 | aerospace and defense technical support | |
| Attindas | 2021 | hygiene products | |
| SEACOR | 2021 | freight transport | |
| manroland GOSS | 2015 | printing systems | |
| Virtek | 2015 | vision and laser projection | |
| Commonwealth Rolled Products | 2020 | aluminum rolled products | |
| Orizon | 2020 | aerospace and defense parts | |
| ADDMAN Engineering | 2021 | additive manufacturing | |
