= Senator Egan =

Senator Egan may refer to:

- Charles M. Egan (1877–1955), New Jersey State Senate
- Dennis Egan (1947–2022), Alaska State Senate
- Michael J. Egan (1926–2016), Georgia State Senate
- Michael Egan (Wisconsin politician) (1827–1910), Wisconsin State Senate
- Robert J. Egan (Illinois politician) (1931–2003), Illinois State Senate
- William A. Egan (1914–1984), Alaska Territorial Senate
