= Loyola Academy =

Jesuit college prep school in Illinois, U.S.

Location
- 1100 Laramie Avenue Wilmette, Illinois; United States; 42°5′1″N 87°45′39″W

Information
- School type: Private, Catholic, Non-profit Coeducational secondary (Grades 9–12) education institution
- Motto: Men and Women for Others
- Religious affiliation: Roman Catholic (Jesuit)
- Established: 1909; 117 years ago
- President: Rev. Gregory J. Ostdiek, SJ
- Chairman: James Walsh '79
- Principal: Timothy Devine '88
- Campus: Suburban: Main Wilmette Campus (Administration & Class room buildings; Satellite Theodore G.Munz, SJ Campus 1901 Johns Drive 60 acres (240,000 m^{2}) (Athletic fields)
- Colors: Maroon and gold
- Athletics: 34 different sports and over 80 athletic teams
- Athletics conference: CCL, GCAC
- Mascot: Rowdy the Ramble
- Team name: Ramblers
- Newspaper: The Prep
- Yearbook: The Year
- Affiliations: NCACSJSEA
- Website: www.goramblers.org

Loyola Academy is a private, co-educational college preparatory high school run by the USA Midwest Province of the Society of Jesus in Wilmette, Illinois, a northern suburb of Chicago, and in the Roman Catholic Archdiocese of Chicago. It is a member of the Jesuit Secondary Education Association and the largest Jesuit high school in America, with over 2,000 students from more than 80 different zip codes throughout the Chicago area. It was founded by the Jesuits in 1909.

== History ==
Loyola Academy was founded as a Roman Catholic, Jesuit, college preparatory school for young men in 1909. The school was originally located in the Rogers Park neighborhood of Chicago, on the campus of Loyola University Chicago's Dumbach Hall; it moved to the current Wilmette campus in 1957. Both Loyola University and its prep school adjunct, Loyola Academy, grew out of St. Ignatius College Prep, a Roman Catholic, Jesuit college preparatory school in Chicago that was founded in 1870 as St. Ignatius College, with both university and preparatory programs for young men. While St. Ignatius transitioned to being solely a preparatory school and remained in the same location, Loyola Academy and University were established in Rogers Park. All three institutions were named after the Basque intellectual and a military officer in the army of a Duke, St. Ignatius of Loyola, who founded the Jesuits.

As a precondition to granting approval to move to the suburbs, the Archdiocese of Chicago required the Jesuits to stipulate that they would continue to serve the young Roman Catholic men of the city of Chicago. Consequently, Loyola Academy has had a significant representation of Chicago residents of various financial means, giving the school an economic diversity fairly unique in the Chicago area. This was achieved through the use of various scholarships and forms of financial aid.

One of Loyola's "sister schools" was Regina Dominican High School, an all-girls Academy located less than a mile away in Wilmette. Beginning in 1970, small groups of select Regina students began commuting to Loyola to take selected advanced science and computer science classes, as these classes were unavailable on their campus at the time.

The Jesuit presence has fallen off from what it once was, with some 40 priests teaching and working at the school in 1961, down to 11 out of roughly 200 staff members in 2007. The priests left for a variety of reasons. Some left due to the child abuse cases surrounding the Catholic church.

Loyola Academy affiliated with Saint Louise de Marillac High School, an all-girls high school from Northfield, Illinois and became co-educational in 1994. The affiliation was done for financial reasons. The President of Marillac was approached by Loyola to consider a co-ed option on the North Shore as requested by the Archdiocese. About that same time, Loyola added on to their existing building. In 2003, Loyola Academy opened a new 60-acre (240,000 m^{2}) campus in Glenview, Illinois. The property, near the decommissioned Glenview Naval Air Station (NAS Glenview), was purchased by Loyola in 2001 and now houses several athletic fields for lacrosse, baseball, softball, and soccer, a cross country path, and a wetland preserve area that has been used as a natural laboratory for science classes.

While Loyola Academy is a Jesuit, Catholic school, it has always admitted non-Catholics seeking a Loyola education.

== Academics ==
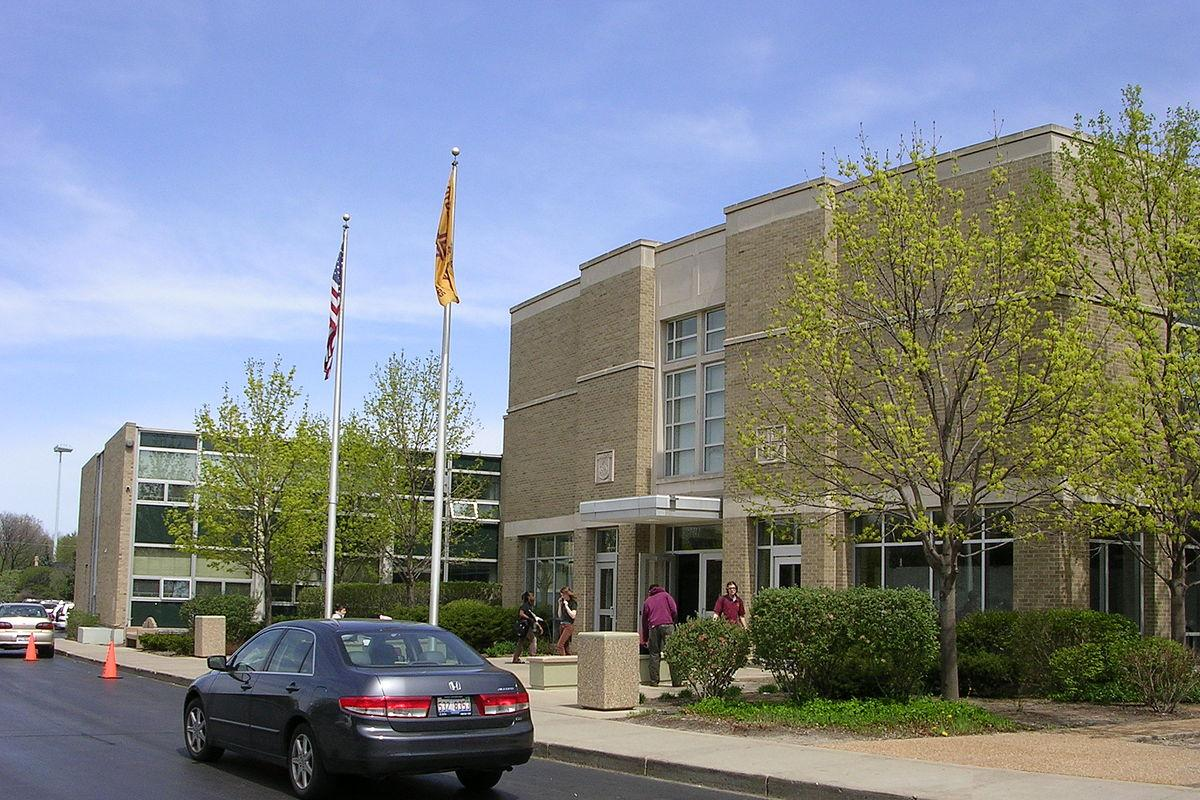
Loyola Academy

Loyola Academy offers a comprehensive liberal arts curriculum with over 110 courses in language arts, fine arts (dance, music, theater, visual arts, and architecture), foreign languages (Spanish, French, Latin, Mandarin Chinese, and Ancient Greek), mathematics, physical education, science, social studies, and theology. (As it is a college-preparatory high school, it does not offer any true vocational courses.) The school has three competitive honors programs (the Dumbach Scholars, the Clavius Scholars, and the Ricci Scholars) and a plethora of students enrolled in AP classes. Loyola also offers the O'Shaughnessy Program, which assists students who show the potential for success in college but may require smaller classes and extra help from teachers. Annually, about 99% of students are accepted by four-year universities.

The school fields a Certamen team and in 2005 six students received perfect scores on the National Latin Examination. Loyola is also very active in forensics, Scholastic Bowl, and Science Olympiad competitions. In 2013, Loyola's scholastic bowl team placed third at both NAQT HSNCT and PACE NSC, the best performance of a team from Illinois at both national championship tournaments.

== Athletics ==
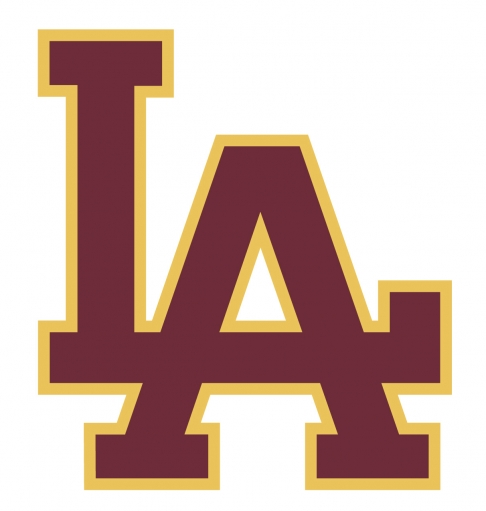

Loyola Academy offers 16 women's sports and 17 men's sports. Its varsity teams are called the Ramblers, which copied from the nickname of the varsity teams at Loyola University. The school competes as a member of the CCL.

The men's lacrosse team won 11 State Titles and 11 runner ups with three straight championships with from 2002 to 2004, with its most recent in 2018.

Prior to the IHSA Football Championships (1974), Loyola won the Prep Bowl in 1965, 1966, and 1969. Loyola won the IHSA State Championship in football in 1993, 2015, 2018, 2022, 2023, and 2024 and was runners-up in 1992, 2011, 2013, 2016, and 2017. Former football coach John Holecek led Ramblers to the state playoffs every year since 2006, including three of the last five Illinois State 8A Finals. In November 2011, the Loyola Academy football team lost to Bolingbrook in the class 8A Illinois State championship. On November 24, 2018 Loyola won the 2018 IHSA 8A Football Championship by beating Brother Rice High School 13–3. In 2022, Loyola won the IHSA Class 8A State Football Championship by beating undefeated Lincoln-Way East High School 13–3, marking their fourth state championship win. Holecek resigned after the championship and was succeeded by Beau Desherow. Former Northwestern Wildcats football head coach Pat Fitzgerald joined the Ramblers' head coaching staff as a parent volunteer, with his middle son, Ryan, serving as the team's starting quarterback. In 2023, Loyola Academy went undefeated and beat Lincoln-Way East High School again to capture their fifth state championship win. In 2024, Loyola Academy defeated York Community High School to capture their third-consecutive state championship.

In 2014 Loyola won the Illinois State Girls Swimming Championship and defeated Fenwick 11–10 (OT) to capture the IHSA Boys Water Polo State Championship. The Ramblers were also State Water Polo Champions in 1978.

Loyola has had a storied history in rowing. In 2017, the Boys' Junior 8+ won the SRAA National Championships.

The girls lacrosse team won the 2023 IHSA state championship over Hinsdale Central.

== Notable alumni ==
=== Athletics ===
- Dan Bellino is a Major League Baseball umpire
- George Bon Salle was a first round draft pick in the 1957 NBA draft. He played briefly with the Chicago Packers.
- John Dee was the head men's basketball coach at the University of Alabama (1953–56) and the University of Notre Dame (1964–71).
- Robert J. Dunne was an Olympic decathlete
- Conor Dwyer is a swimmer who was a gold medalist in the 4*200 freestyle relay at the 2012 Summer Olympics as well as the gold medalist in the 4*200m freestyle and bronze medalist in the 200m freestyle in the 2016 Summer Olympics.
- Colin Falls is a former Notre Dame basketball player who played professionally for Italy's Orlandina Basket.
- Rob Feaster is a former professional basketball player.
- Dave Finzer was an NFL punter (1984–85).
- John Fitzgerald was an Olympic pentathlete, competing in the 1972 and 1976 Olympics.
- Paul Florence was a Major League Baseball catcher (1926), playing for the New York Giants.
- Tim Foley was an All-American defensive back at Purdue, later an All-Pro NFL defensive back (1970–80), playing his career with the Miami Dolphins. He was a member of the Super Bowl VII and Super Bowl VIII champions.
- Christian Friedrich is a professional baseball player.
- Josh Kreutz is an NFL center for the Indianapolis Colts
- Charlie Leibrandt was a Major League Baseball pitcher (1979–93). Pitching most of his career for the Kansas City Royals, he was a member of the 1985 World Series Champions.
- Freddie Lindstrom was a Major League Baseball third baseman and outfielder (1924–36), playing most of his career with the New York Giants. He was elected to the Baseball Hall of Fame in 1976. ^{2}
- Tom Machowski (born 1953), retired professional ice hockey defenceman
- Lucas McGee is a rowing coach for the United States National Team.
- Bert Metzger was an offensive guard, starring on the Notre Dame National Championship teams of 1929 and 1930. He was elected a member of the College Football Hall of Fame in 1982.
- Al Montoya was an NHL goaltender (2008–2019). ^{3}
- Jim Mooney was an NFL player (1930–35).
- Steve Quinn was a center (1968) who played for the Houston Oilers.
- Nick Rassas was an NFL safety (1966–68), playing for the Atlanta Falcons.
- John Shannon is an American football long snapper, played for the Notre Dame Fighting Irish
- Bob Skoglund was an NFL end (1947) who played for the Green Bay Packers.

=== Politics and public service ===
- Michael Cabonargi, commissioner of Cook County Board of Review (2011–present)
- Mark Curran, Lake County Sheriff (2006–2018)
- Peter H. Daly was a Vice Admiral in the U.S. Navy and later became the CEO of the U.S. Naval Institute (2011–2023).
- Richard A. Devine was the Cook County State's Attorney (1996–2008).
- Robert J. Egan, was an Illinois state senator and judge
- Neil Hartigan was an Illinois politician, serving as Lt. Governor of Illinois (1973–1977) and Attorney General of Illinois (1983–1991).
- Neal Katyal was the lead counsel in the Supreme Court case Hamdan v. Rumsfeld. He was Principal Deputy Solicitor General of the United States.
- James C. Kenny was the United States Ambassador to Ireland.
- Dan Kotowski was an Illinois State Senator, representing the 33rd Senatorial District (2007–2013).
- George M. O'Brien was a United States representative for the Illinois's 17th congressional district (1973–86).

=== Arts and letters ===
- Pat Foley is a sportscaster, best known for his work in ice hockey with the Chicago Blackhawks.
- Eckhard Gerdes is a novelist (Cistern Tawdry, The Million-Year Centipede, or, Liquid Structures and My Landlady the Lobotomist) and editor (The Journal of Experimental Fiction).
- Gilbert V. Hartke is a social activist and founded the drama department at the Catholic University of America.
- Mike Leonard is an author and correspondent for The Today Show
- David Marconi is a screenwriter (Enemy of the State, Live Free or Die Hard).
- Bill Murray is an actor and comedian (Lost in Translation, Caddyshack, Ghostbusters).
- Brian Doyle-Murray is an actor, and the older brother of actors Bill Murray and Joel Murray.
- Joel Murray is an actor and the brother of Bill Murray and Brian Doyle-Murray.
- John Musker is an animated film director (The Little Mermaid, Aladdin)
- Richard L. Newhafer, novelist and teleplay writer
- Jonathan Nolan is a writer
- Timothy L. O'Brien is a journalist and author.
- Chris O'Donnell is an actor (Scent of a Woman, Batman Forever, NCIS: Los Angeles).
- Westbrook Pegler was a newspaper columnist and critic of the Democratic Party.^{4}
- Bill Plante was a journalist with CBS News.
- Gregory Qaiyum (GQ) is an actor and writer (The Bomb-itty of Errors).
- Jeffery Ameen Qaiyum (JAQ) is a beatboxer and contributor to The Bomb-itty of Errors.
- Robert Ryan (1927) was an actor (The Wild Bunch, The Dirty Dozen).
- Eddie Shin is an actor.
- Keong Sim, actor
- Peter Steinfels is an author (A People Adrift: The Crisis of the Roman Catholic Church in America)

=== Business and technology ===
- Ed Boon is the co-creator of the video game Mortal Kombat.
- George Halas Jr. was the president of the Chicago Bears of the NFL from 1963–79.
- Jim Irsay was the owner of the NFL's Indianapolis Colts.
- Jeffrey Jordan is an entrepreneur and son of Michael Jordan.
- Jim Moran was an auto dealer and philanthropist.
- Danny Wirtz, owner of the NHL's Chicago Blackhawks and chairman of the Wirtz Corporation.

=== Television ===
- Eric Bolling, conservative political commentator on Fox News and Fox Business.

=== Religious life ===
- Timothy J. O'Malley, bishop, Archdiocese of Chicago

== Notable staff ==
- John Holecek is a former NFL linebacker (1995–2002), playing most of his career with the Buffalo Bills. He was the school's head football coach from 2006–2022.

== Notes ==
- ^{1} Did not graduate from Loyola; transferred to North Shore Country Day School after second year.
- ² Did not graduate from Loyola; left after second year to play in the minor leagues.
- ³ Did not graduate from Loyola; transferred to Fossil Ridge High School in Texas after second year.
- ^{4} Did not graduate from Loyola; dropped out after a few semesters to take a job as a reporter.
