= Jazz (design) =

1990s design featured on disposable cups

Jazz

Jazz is a trademarked design that is featured on disposable cups. The design was introduced in 1992, and is considered an icon of 1990s culture. Jazz has also become a meme and has gained a cult following. Fans have applied the design to various objects, including automobiles, shirts, and shoes. Cups with the Jazz design were initially manufactured by Sweetheart Cup Company, which was later purchased by Solo Cup Company in 2004. Solo continued production of the disposable cups.

== Design ==
The Jazz design consists of a broad, jagged, crayon-like brushstroke of teal coloring, topped by a finer zig-zagged brushstroke of purple coloring.

Until 2015, the identity of Jazz's designer had remained largely unknown. The popularity of the design led to a Reddit inquiry that year as to who created it, ultimately revealing Gina Ekiss as the designer. During the same year, Stephanie Miller claimed on Reddit to be the true creator of the Jazz design. Some reports credited Ekiss as the creator but this has not been confirmed by Solo Cup Company.

Kasey Skala, spokesperson for Solo Cup Company, subsequently said that the company did some internal research on the creator of Jazz. However, Skala stated that most of the people who worked on the Jazz project were no longer with Solo following its acquisition of Sweetheart Cup Company. According to Skala, "At this time, our best assumption is that a former employee named Gina created the design, but we are unable to confirm whether this is accurate or not."

=== Gina Ekiss ===
Gina Ekiss (then known as Gina Boyd-Burgess) began working at Sweetheart Cup Company in 1987, after graduating from Missouri State University. She was one of approximately 32 artists working for Sweetheart's art department, based in Springfield, Missouri. During the late 1980s, Sweetheart planned to replace its disposable cup design, "Preference," which featured a gray base with a thin red line that formed two leaves. Sweetheart became disappointed with the new designs submitted by external agencies. Dennis Marsh, a manager for the company, said that the design agencies did not understand the specifics of the company's printing process, and that their designs were too complicated to use.

In 1989, a company contest was announced to choose a new stock image for the disposable cups that would have wide appeal, as the company's cups were used in various locations such as hospitals and fast-food restaurants. Marsh was influential in the company's decision to hold the contest. One of the new design's limitations was that it could only have one or two colors, due to the high speed of the printing press. At the time, Sweetheart was transitioning to digital technology, and Ekiss was one of the few workers who was skilled in computer design.

Ekiss submitted three or four design ideas. In 1991, Sweetheart chose Ekiss's design, which utilized her favorite colors: teal and purple. Jazz was based on an earlier image named Razzi that Ekiss had designed while she was in college. The original image was drawn on vellum using charcoal; according to Ekiss, "I think I probably just had some [charcoal] on hand at my desk and was just messing around and I liked what came out." To create Jazz, Ekiss remade her Razzi image digitally by scanning it. Ekiss later recalled that she had no idea what to call her cup design when it was chosen: "I had to come up with a name for it, so we just called it jazz." The name is a variation of her earlier Razzi image.

Ekiss did not receive a bonus payment for her design, and did not receive royalties as Sweetheart took ownership of the design. Full production of the Jazz disposable cups began in early 1992, and the design was also used for disposable bowls and plates. Ekiss worked for Sweetheart until 2002, when the company relocated its art department. At the time, Jazz was the company's top-grossing stock design.

=== Stephanie Miller ===
In the late 1980s, Stephanie Miller worked as a graphic designer for Imperial Bondware, a paper and plastic cup manufacturer based in Ohio. According to Miller, Imperial Bondware held a contest for its three graphic designers to create a new cup design. She used paint brushes and ink to create the winning design, and she designed it in a way that it would be easy to print: "The whole idea was that it would be easier to be printed, because the design didn't have to line up at all. You didn't have to worry about edges lining up." Miller later said that she believed her design was titled "Brush Strokes", but she could not remember for sure. According to Miller, officials for Imperial Bondware considered her new design too "forward thinking" and stopped using it after approximately one year. Miller acknowledged she did not have proof that she created the design, although she wrote on Reddit in 2015:

Someone from Sweetheart picked it up, liked it, set it on Gina's desk and asked to tweak it just a little to avoid copyright issues. That design came out of my head. Same colors, same everything, except Gina made the purple line a little smaller. This was a common practice between the cup companies, and Gina was just doing what she was told. But she's not being truthful if she's claiming that she designed it.

Ekiss denied that she took the design from Miller. International Paper, which purchased Imperial Bondware, was unable to find the design in its company archives. Miller said, "I feel frustrated. I know in my heart this thing came straight from my head. […] I am not doing this because I want the money. I want credit for what I designed. This is my work."

== Popularity ==
The Jazz design is considered an icon of 1990s culture, often being associated with the decade. The design ultimately became a meme, and gained a cult following. It gained popularity among Internet artists in 2010 or 2011. The fan community sold shirts featuring the design, and also created fan pages for Jazz on Facebook and Tumblr to document various instances of the design's expanded usage, including automobiles, shoes, bicycle helmets, tattoos, nail art, and others. The design was also used as the profile image for the Instagram account fuckjerry. In 2018, the Springfield Cardinals wore jerseys featuring the Jazz design during a game. The jerseys were then auctioned to benefit cancer patients.

Disposable Jazz cups remained available as of 2019. In 2015, Ekiss was asked how she felt about having designed something that became part of 1990s culture and that would be remembered for generations; she laughed and responded, "I'm not sure how to answer that. It just seems so insane to me." She was thrilled that the design remained popular, and was surprised by how popular it had become: "I was pretty shocked, to say the least. It just seems like such a random thing to me after all this time." Miller, in 2015, said she did not know why people were interested in the design, and said "I had no idea it would get the crazy cult following that it has now. But I think it's awesome!"

In Oliver Tree's 2018 music video for "All That x Alien Boy", the Jazz design is featured on clothing and a monster truck. Solo was upset with the design's usage and requested that Tree not feature it in any subsequent videos. Solo has also sought to remove online listings of merchandise featuring the design, noting that it is trademarked.

== See also ==
- Memphis Group
- Vaporwave
- Portland International Airport carpet
