= Sweetheart Cup Company =

North American manufacturer (1911–2004)

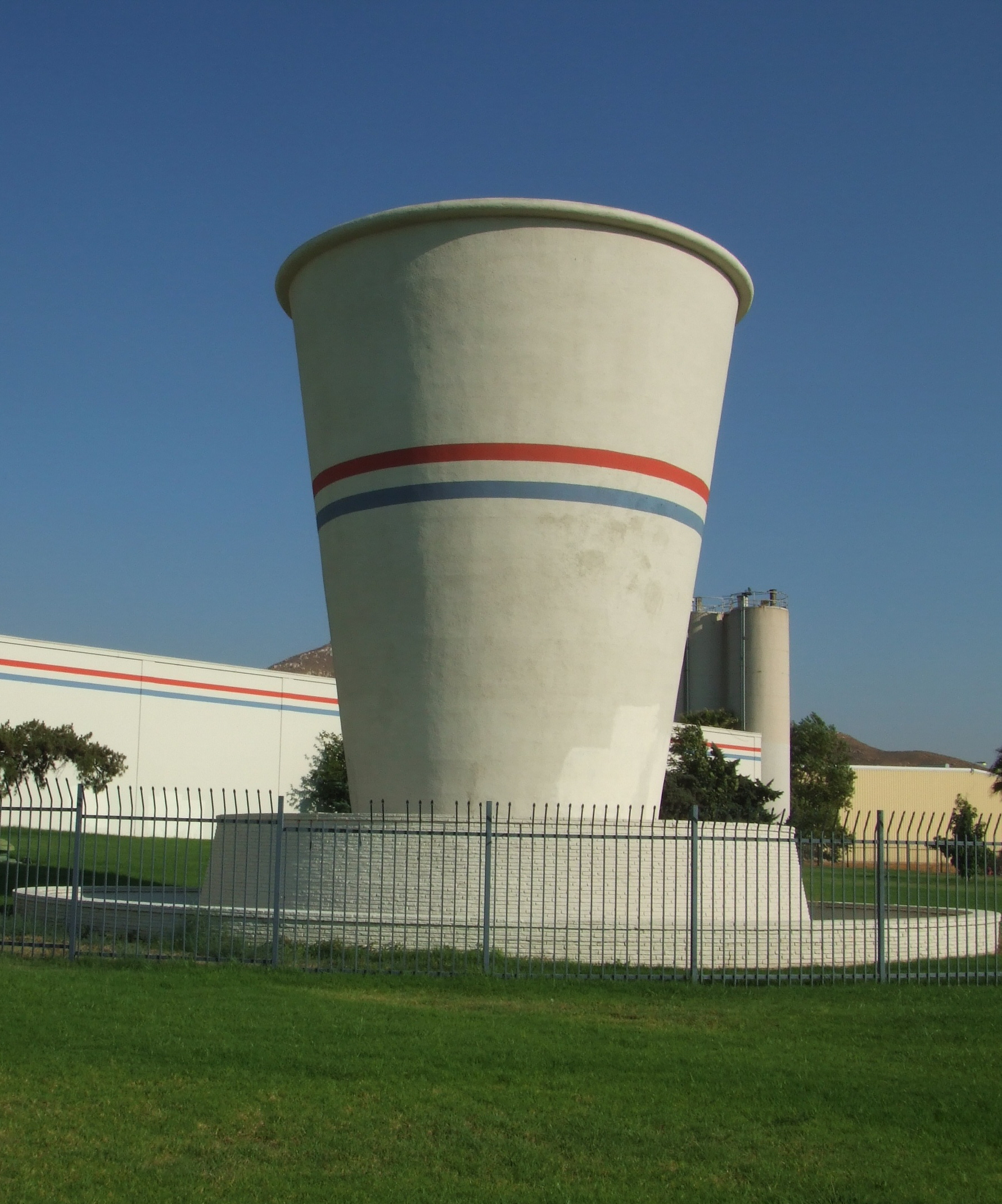
The world's largest "paper" cup in front of what was once the Lily-Tulip manufacturing company in Riverside, California, later Sweetheart Cup Company. Actually made of poured concrete, the cup stands about 68.1 feet (20.8 m) tall.

Sweetheart Cup Company was a North American company that made paper cups, plastic cups and related products. In 2004, Sweetheart was acquired by the Solo Cup Company, which itself was acquired by Dart Container on May 4, 2012.

The company's brands included Sweetheart, Trophy, Lily, Preference, Jazz, Simple Elegance, Silent Service, and Guildware.

== History ==
=== Early history ===
In 1911, Russian immigrants and brothers Joseph, Isaac, Nathan, and Samuel Shapiro, formed an ice cream cone business, called Eastern Baking Company, in Boston. In 1920, they moved the business to Owings Mills, Maryland, in the hopes of pursuing year-round ice cream sales. It was incorporated as the Maryland Baking Company in 1926. A Chicago branch was opened in the 1930s. The family would set up independent companies in each city, open a warehouse, and then make ice cream until the market justified opening a factory.

The company then began to diversify, first expanding to plastic drinking straws in 1933, then paperbook matches in 1935. By 1950, they entered the paper cup business. The family voted 14-1 against the move, but Joseph convinced them to agree.

The company formed Sweetheart Plastics as a subsidiary in the 1950s. The Sweetheart name was inspired by a picture of two children using straws to drink a milkshake from the same glass, their heads forming a heart. Its first products included plastic dishes for ice cream sundaes and plastic covers for paper cups. In 1957, it began producing plastic containers for dairy producers. By the early '60s, paper products made up 75% of the company's volume.

=== Maryland Cup ===
Maryland Cup Corporation held its IPO in February 1960, consolidating 32 separate companies controlled by the Shapiro family. It had 20 plants in 13 states at the time and Joseph Shapiro was named chairman and his son-in-law Merrill Bank served as CEO. Company headquarters were moved to Baltimore. In 1962, Sweetheart opened a new plant in Wilmington, Massachusetts to produce plastic cups, plates, bowls, food containers, and compartmented plastic plates.

The company soon was the world's largest producer of ice cream cones and drinking straws. During the 1960s, Maryland Cup picked up commercial customers, including Dairy Queen, A&W Root Beer, Disneyland, and the Orange Bowl. It also developed clamshell foam containers for McDonald's. It also expanded through the acquisition of the Flex Straw Company International in 1969, as well as the opening of a facilities in the United Kingdom and Manchester, New York, in 1970. By this time the company operated 27 plants, including those in Los Angeles, Chicago, Dallas, St. Louis, Atlanta, and Pittsburgh.

As Americans replaced china with plastic, Maryland Cup accounted for 20- 25% of the annual sales in the paper and plastic dinnerware market by 1980. The company had 14 disposable products factories, 10 Eat-It-All ice cream cone bakeries, and joint ventures in the UK, Canada, Netherlands, and Japan.

During this time, it became a frequent takeover target from other companies. In 1983, the company was finally sold to Fort Howard Paper Company, a Wisconsin-based paper manufacturer, for $536 million. At the time, Maryland Cup had 33 plants, more than 10,000 employees, and a net worth of $250 million.

Relations between the two companies proved to be contentious in the years after the acquisition, resulting in many former Maryland Cup executives leaving. Fort Howard focused on cost cutting through layoffs, cutting employee benefits, and liquidating the company's pension fund. By the mid-80s, the firm's reputation with its customers had deteriorated and cup sales had started to slide. Despite increased efficiency, orders were down as disgruntled buyers went elsewhere. In 1986, Fort Howard acquired Lily-Tulip, another maker of disposable cups, for $326 million.

=== Private equity and Sweetheart ===
In 1988, Fort Howard was taken private in a management-led leveraged buyout worth $3.9 billion. The deal received funding through Morgan Stanley. In 1989, Sweetheart and Lily were spun off and sold to Sweetheart Holdings for $532 million. The disposable products company was renamed Sweetheart Cup Company and moved to Chicago.

Despite attempts to turn the company around, sales continued to decline. McDonald's stopped using Sweetheart's foam clamshell containers and its yellow banana-split dish in 1990. It also closed a Wilmington plant, moving operations to facilities in Massachusetts, New Hampshire, and Maryland. Saddled with debt, the company's net worth had fallen to −$95 million by 1991.

In 1992, Sweetheart introduced its Jazz disposable cups, which would become the company's top-grossing stock design. Morgan Stanley sold the company to American Industrial Partners in 1993 for $441 million. AIP held 66% of the company, while the General Motors Corporation's employee benefit plans held the rest. In 1994, new management cut staff to 7,000 employees and closed several facilities. In 1997, it sold off the Eat-It-All ice cream cone brand and announced the closure of a facility Riverside, California. In 1998, the Fonda Group took a significant stake in the company, reorganizing it under the SF Holdings Group.

In 2000, the company consolidated distribution to Maryland and Massachusetts. Corporate headquarters were also moved to Owings Mills. Sweetheart began a restructuring in 2001 that shut down plants in Manchester, New Hampshire, Somerville, Massachusetts, and LaFayette, Georgia. Following the September 11 terrorist attacks, a reduction in business and leisure travel hit the company's hotel and restaurant sales. Sweetheart recorded a loss of $3.15 million for its 2002 fiscal year.

=== Purchase by Solo Cup ===
It was purchased by Solo Cup Company for $800 million in 2004. In 2010, Solo announced it would close the Owings Mills facility in 2012. It was demolished in 2013 to make way for new retail space.
