= Boart Longyear =

International mineral exploration company

Boart Longyear Ltd.
- Industry: Mining services and products
- Predecessor: E.J. Longyear ("Longyear") Company
- Founded: 1890; 136 years ago
- Founder: Edmund J. Longyear
- Headquarters: Salt Lake City, Utah, US
- Products: Drilling equipment and performance tooling
- Owner: American Industrial Partners (2024–present)
- Number of employees: 5,000 (July 2018)
- Website: www.boartlongyear.com

Boart Longyear is an international mineral exploration company founded in 1890 in the United States. It is headquartered in Salt Lake City, Utah, with regional offices and operations in the Asia-Pacific region, North and South America, Europe, and Africa. The company provides mineral exploration services and drilling products for the mining industry and also has a presence in drilling water exploration, environmental sampling, energy, and oil sands exploration. As of 2018, it employed more than 5,000 people.

== Company history ==
=== 1880s to Early 1900s ===
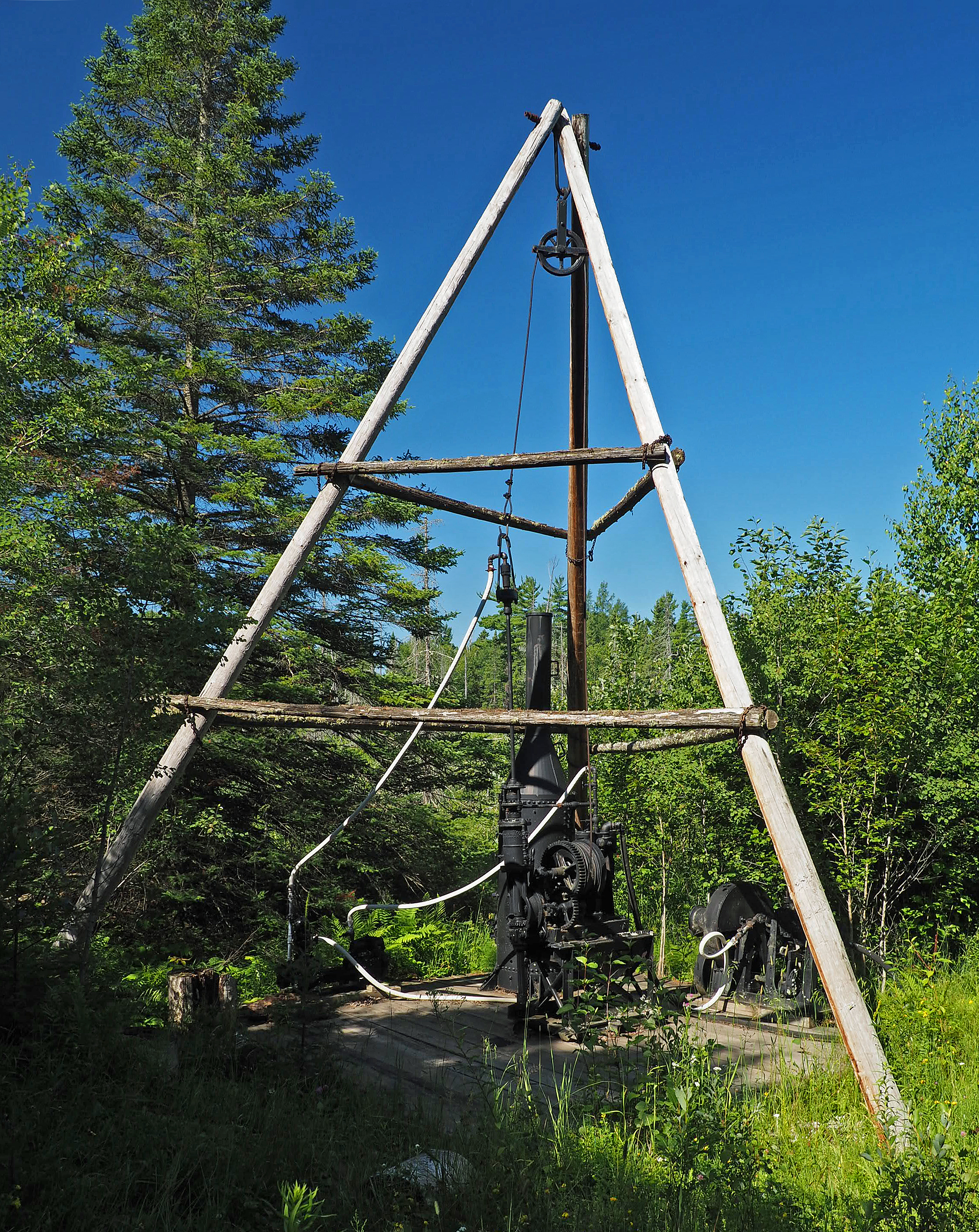
Replica of E.J. Longyear's exploration diamond drilling rig on the Mesabi Range

In 1888, Edmund J. Longyear, a mining engineer from the first graduating class at the Michigan Mining School, drilled the first diamond core hole in the Mesabi Iron Range in northern Minnesota. In 1890, he formed a contract diamond drilling company to serve the rapidly growing U.S. iron ore mining and steel industry. In 1903, Longyear and John E. Hodge formed a partnership called Longyear and Hodge to expand their business, which included contract drilling, shaft-sinking, mineral ventures, and related consulting work.

In 1911, the Longyear and Hodge partnership merged with Longyear's separate contract drilling company to E.J. Longyear ("Longyear") Company. The company's first price list in 1912 featured 19 drill models with drilling capabilities between 750 and 5,000 feet. Those drills were powered mainly by steam engines, which later were replaced by internal combustion engines developed in the 1920s. The company expanded rapidly in the U.S. and overseas. From 1912 to 1916, the company drilled for copper in Cuba, the company's first international project. In 1914, Longyear began setting up the first of six diamond core rigs for Phelps Dodge Corporation to explore for copper in Arizona. In 1919, the company began a 15-month drilling project in Yunnan Province, China.

=== 1920s to 1930s ===
By the 1920s, about half of the company's drilling was outside the continental United States. Robert Longyear, Edmund's son, became president of the firm in 1924, preserving the chain of family ownership and management that would continue for another 40 years. In 1929, Longyear sold almost US$1.5 million worth of drilling equipment to other drillers. The following year the company formed its first foreign subsidiary in Canada. The company also signed its first contract for work in Africa, sending equipment and a crew to provide drilling for copper ores. However, the stock market crash of October 1929 and the subsequent Great Depression reduced earnings to $79,000 in 1933. During the 1930s, Longyear took on a project drilling for core samples for the proposed Golden Gate Bridge in San Francisco. In spite of the financial crisis, the 1930s saw improvements in diamond drilling technology, including the use of industrial-quality diamonds mined in Africa that were called "boarts". In 1936, South Africa's Anglo American Corporation formed Boart Products South Africa (Pty) Limited, which was later named Boart International. The new company developed the first mechanically-set diamond core bits, which were less expensive than the hand-set core bits that used more expensive Brazilian diamonds (carbonados).

=== 1940s to 1950s ===
Longyear's business gradually improved in the 1940s in response to expanding worldwide mineral exploration. In 1949, the company began a close, long-term general business and marketing relationship with Christensen Diamond Products (CDP). Christensen's diamond knowledge and buying power combined with Longyear's drilling expertise created a platform that the two companies leveraged to introduce dependable and highly productive surface-set diamond bits to the industry. During the 1950s, the two firms jointly developed business ventures in Japan, France, Canada, Mexico, the Netherlands, Australia, Germany, the Philippines and Costa Rica. Meanwhile, Longyear expanded its Canadian business, which grew to $10 million by the end of 1967. This growth fueled new technological innovation, and in 1958 Longyear patented the first wireline core retrieval system, which increased productivity on worksites within the diamond drilling industry and made tripping core from the bottom of the hole safer for the drilling assistant. This system later became known as the Q Wireline System.

=== 1960s to 1970s ===
In 1960, Vincent N. Burnhart became President and CEO of Longyear Company. In the following decade, the company began growing into international markets.

In 1964, Longyear sold 25 percent of its family-owned stock to FACTS, a Luxembourg-based holding company owned jointly by Boart International and Christensen Diamond Products Company. Three years later FACTS exercised its option to purchase another 25 percent of Longyear's family stock. The Longyear family retained 30 percent of the company's stock, with the remaining 20 percent owned by employees.

In 1965, when Longyear's annual sales had reached US$15 million, the company bought more land in Minneapolis and persuaded the city government to vacate Erie Street to accommodate its expansion. In 1969, Longyear opened a new Minneapolis office building and an enlarged manufacturing plant, bringing the company's headquarters and U.S. production onto one site for the first time. Longyear sales reached US$40 million in 1970.

After the death of Robert Longyear in 1970, and Vincent Burnhart in 1971, the board of directors appointed John Hoffmeister as president and chairman of the board of the company. FACTS was dissolved when Boart International (a wholly owned subsidiary of Anglo American) bought out CDP's interest in Longyear.

=== 1974 to 2000 ===
In 1974, Boart International invested capital which helped Longyear to become the world's leading manufacturer of diamond bits.

Boart Longyear engineers in North Bay, Ontario, secured a reliable source of high-performance synthetic diamonds, which triggered the development of a new bit design – the impregnated-diamond bit. Longyear engineers developed a new crown that consisted of synthetic diamonds evenly distributed throughout a composite matrix. This new design could drill further and faster than surface-set bits and cut through much harder material. By 1980, 75 percent of Longyear's Canadian-produced bits were of the new impregnated type, and Longyear was manufacturing diamond bits in more than eight countries.

In 1975, the Chicago Pneumatic Tool Company ended its production of diamond drills. Longyear purchased the rights to make and sell Chicago Pneumatic's small CP-65 compressed air drill designed for underground use. Longyear also made spare parts for the hundreds of CP-65s already in use.

In the 1960s and 1970s, Longyear began to diversify into other areas beyond traditional mineral exploration drilling. The company began using diamond bits for drilling and sawing concrete in the construction industry. In 1977, Longyear purchased rights to make concrete saws from the Drillistics Company. The firm's Salt Lake City plant began making diamond saw blades in the early 1980s.

In 1983, Longyear acquired Lang Exploratory Drilling based in Utah, and in 1984 purchased Cushion Cut, a firm producing diamond tools to saw concrete in runways and highways. In 1986, Longyear acquired three further companies: Morissette, an underground and surface diamond drilling firm; Brainard-Kilman, a maker of civil engineering devices, such as well monitoring and test equipment; and ChemGrout a mfg of cement grouting equipment. Longyear acquired Slope Indicator Company, the nation's largest producer of geotechnical instruments, and Northern Air Supply in 1988, followed by the Campbell Pacific Division in 1989 and WTD Environmental Drilling in 1990. In 1994, these acquisitions were followed by the North Star Drilling Company, which specialized in sonic drilling.

On January 2, 1995, Boart International and the Longyear Company merged into a single company; the new company changed its name to Boart Longyear Limited, adopting a new logo and corporate colors. Most of Boart Longyear's workforce and revenues in the mid-1990s came from international operations. Operations in the United States employed about 1,000 people and accounted for about $130 million in sales, compared to 8,000 employees and $600 million in annual revenues worldwide.

=== 2000 to Present ===
Despite being owned by Anglo American for more than 30 years, Boart Longyear was considered a non-core asset for the Johannesburg based mining company. In 2005, Boart Longyear was acquired by the private equity firms Advent International, Bain Capital, and several management investors. The headquarters were then moved to Salt Lake City. Since the sale by Anglo American, the company's management has carried out a number of ownership changes, restructuring initiatives, and acquisitions. In October 2006, Advent sold Boart Longyear to the Australian investment firm, Macquarie Bank, and, in April 2007, Macquarie took Boart Longyear public with an A$2.3 billion initial public offering (IPO) on the ASX stock exchange, the second largest IPO in the history of the ASX. The patented Stage waterway bit design was introduced and provided the first extended 25mm crown in the market.

In 2008 Boart Longyear acquired Eklund Drilling, Britton Brothers, Aqua Drilling and Westrod Engineering, and launched the new Quick Descent Core Barrel Assembly. In early 2009, Paul Brunner retired as chief executive officer of the company and was succeeded by Craig Kipp, who had previously spent three years as chief operating officer.

In early 2010 Boart Longyear introduced new drilling products including a heli-portable surface drill with integrated rod handling, patented surface set bit technology and patented spearpoint design for the corebarrel head assembly. In 2011, Boart Longyear's revenue was $2 billion.

In late 2012, Craig Kipp resigned as CEO amidst slowdowns in mineral business and capital expenditure revisions, leading investors to expect further deterioration of Boart's revenue. Company chairman David McLemore stepped in as acting CEO. Longtime Chief Financial Officer, Joseph Ragan, resigned several months later. Richard O'Brien, former CEO of Newmont Mining Corporation, joined Boart Longyear as CEO on April 1, 2013.

On July 15, 2013, Boart Longyear announced the sale of its Environmental and Infrastructure drilling services operations to Cascade Drilling, L.P. of Woodinville, Washington.

In August 2013, Boart Longyear founder, Edmund J. Longyear, was nominated for inclusion in the International Mining Hall of Fame, having been inducted into the National Mining Hall of Fame in Leadville, Colo in 1990.

In January 2024, Boart Longyear enters into Arrangement Agreement with private equity firm American Industrial Partners for Take-Private Transaction. The transaction was completed in April.

== Bibliography ==
- Longyear, Edmund J., and Walter R. Eastman, Longyear: The Mesabi and Beyond, Gilbert, Minn.: Iron Range Historical Society, 1984.
- www.mnhs.org
- Pine, Carol, "Around the World with Longyear," Northliner, January–February 1977, pp. 30–33.
- Swinton, Heidi, Longyear: The First 100 Years, Minneapolis: Longyear Company, 1990.
- Walden, David, "Boart Longyear Company," in Centennial Utah: The Beehive State on the Eve of the Twenty-First Century, edited by G. Wesley Johnson and Marian Ashby Johnson, Encino, Calif.: Cherbo Publishing Group, 1995, pp. 112–13,.
- Funding Universe
- Answers.com
