= WNTH =

Radio station at New Trier High School in Winnetka, Illinois

- Winnetka, Illinois; United States
- Broadcast area: Chicago
- Frequency: 88.1 MHz
- Branding: WNTH 88.1FM "The Voice of New Trier"

Programming
- Format: Variety
- Affiliations: AP Radio

Ownership
- Owner: New Trier Township High School District 203

History
- First air date: 1961
- Call sign meaning: New Trier High

Technical information
- Licensing authority: FCC
- Facility ID: 6052
- Class: A
- ERP: 47 watts
- HAAT: 46 meters (151 ft)
- Transmitter coordinates: 42°05′39″N 87°43′09″W

Links
- Public license information: Public file; LMS
- Webcast: WNTH Stream
- Website: WNTH Radio

WNTH is a high school radio station located in Winnetka, Illinois and is owned and operated by New Trier High School. The station is partially ran by a student club who help produce programming for the station.

In the 1950s, New Trier became the first U.S. high school with an educational, non-commercial FM broadcast license for a radiated station. The station would commence broadcasting in 1961. WNTH's station and studio is hosted at New Trier's main campus in Winnetka. The station hosts a variety of music genres and podcasts mainly produced by students. WNTH is also an affiliate of the Associated Press and receives newscasts on their behalf.
