= Charles N. Mills =

American businessman (born 1961)

Charlie Mills
- Born: Charles N. Mills; 1961 (age 64–65); Chicago, Illinois, U.S.
- Education: Cornell University (MBA)
- Occupation: Businessman
- Title: CEO, Medline Industries
- Term: 1997–2023

Charles N. Mills (born 1961) is an American businessman, and the chair and former chief executive of Medline Industries.

== Early life ==
Mills is the son of James Stephen "Jim" Mills (1936–2019), who was the co-founder (with his brother Jon), and former CEO of Medline. Mills earned a bachelor's degree and an MBA, both from Cornell University.

== Career ==
Mills has been CEO of Medline Industries since 1997, the fourth generation to run the company, founded in 1910. His cousin, Andy Mills is president, and Andy's brother-in-law Jim Abrams is COO.

Alongside his cousin and brother-in-law, Mills took over when the company had around half a billion sales. It is now worth approximately $3 billion, according to Forbes. His company has provided medical supplies during Hurricane Katrina, for which the company was awarded the American Red Cross, Hurricane Harvey, and during the Coronavirus pandemic.

Mills transitioned to the role of chairman of the company in 2023, after 26 years as CEO. At the time of Medline's initial public offering in December 2025, his net worth was estimated to be $10.9 billion.
