= Saint Louise de Marillac High School =

Former Catholic high school in Northfield, IL, USA

Coordinates: 42°06′2″N 87°47′52″W

Saint Louise de Marillac High School was an all-girls Catholic secondary school in Northfield, Illinois, United States, from 1967 to 1994, run by the Daughters of Charity. In 1994, Marillac merged with Loyola Academy.

The former campus of Marillac High School, designed by Schmidt, Garden, and Erikson, received an award from the American Institute of Architects.

Coming Home is an initiative to gather alumnae, faculty, and the Daughters of Charity to celebrate the spirit of Marillac High School.

In 1994, the campus and school was purchased by Christian Heritage Academy.
