= Sunset Ridge Country Club =

Country club in Cook County, Illinois

Coordinates: 42°06′48″N 87°47′45″W

- Interactive map of Sunset Ridge Country Club

Club information
- Location: Northfield Township, Cook County, near Northfield, Illinois, USA
- Type: Private
- Tota holes: 18
- Website: Club homepage
- Designed by: William Diddel; Jacobson Golf Course Design
- Par: 71
- Length: 6,752
- Course rating: 73.1

Sunset Ridge Country Club is a private country club located in Cook County, just outside the city limits of Northfield, Illinois, a suburb of Chicago.

Founded in 1923 and renovated in 2005, it features a 6,752 yard 18-hole course. Sunset Ridge features a course rating of 73.0 and a slope of 133. It has hosted the Western Open in 1972 and the Women's Western Open in 1935. The Club hosted the 2018 Western Amateur Championship.

The greens and fairways are made of a bent grass.

This facility used to offer a four-hole par 3 course that was primarily for children.
