= Medline Inc. =

American healthcare company

- Formerly: Medline Industries, LP
- Type: Public
- Traded as: Nasdaq: MDLN (Class A); Russell 1000 component
- Industry: Healthcare
- Founded: 1966; 60 years ago
- Founders: Jon Mills; Jim Mills
- Headquarters: Northfield, Illinois, U.S.
- Key people: Charlie Mills (chair); Jim Boyle (CEO)
- Products: Medical and surgical supplies
- Revenue: ▲US$28.4 billion (2025)
- Operating income: ▲US$2.21 billion (2025)
- Net income: ▼US$1.16 billion (2025)
- Total assets: ▲US$38.5 billion (2025)
- Total equity: ▼US$19.3 billion (2025)
- Number of employees: 45,000 (2025)
- Website: www.medline.com

Medline Inc. is an American public healthcare company headquartered in Northfield, Illinois. In June 2021 it was acquired by a consortium of private equity firms Blackstone, Carlyle and Hellman & Friedman valuing the company at US$34 billion in one of the largest leveraged buyouts of all time. It was the nation's largest privately held manufacturer and distributor of medical supplies providing products, education, clinical programs and services across the continuum of care with operations in over 125 countries and territories.

In 2022, Medline had sales of $21.2 billion. Medline was ranked at #15 on the Forbes 2022 list of largest privately held companies in America and employs over 35,000 people.

== History ==
In 1910, A. L. Mills established the Northwestern Garment Factory, making aprons for stock yards. In 1912, he established Mills Hospital Supplies Inc., making surgical gowns and nurses uniforms for hospitals. In the 1920s, his son Irving took over the business and began distributing general medical supplies in addition to the garments. In 1961, Irving sold the company to Cenco. In 1966, A. L.’s grandsons Jim and Jon Mills left Cenco and founded Medline with approximately 12,000 square feet of warehouse space and one loading dock in Evanston, Illinois In 1968, Medline opened its first textile manufacturing facility in Covington, Indiana. In 1972, Medline opened its first non-textile manufacturing division (Dynacor) with the purchase of an injection molding company.

In 1995, Medline opened its first facility for assembling sterile procedure trays (SPTs), in Waukegan, Illinois. In 1996, Medline entered the distribution business. In 2001, Medline started manufacturing private label wound care products for CVS, Walgreens, Target, Dollar General and Family Dollar.

In April 2007, Medline acquired the Curad brand of first-aid products from Beiersdorf, entering the retail market. The Curad brand includes products such as bandages, surgical tape, and liquid bandage.

In 2009, Medline Launched Generation Pink exam gloves to help raise breast cancer awareness and turned the original Pink Glove Dance video into a viral breast cancer awareness campaign, reaching 14+ million people. In 2011, Medline introduced BioMask, the first-ever FDA-cleared antiviral medical facemask shown to inactivate flu viruses.

As of 2016, Medline offers over 550,000 medical products and clinical solutions to hospitals, extended care facilities, surgery centers, physician offices, home care agencies and providers, and retailers. It has over 35,000 employees in over 125 countries and territories (such as the USA, Canada, Mexico, Spain, Germany, the United Kingdom, France, Italy, Japan, Australia and New Zealand) and include clinicians, researchers, engineers, financial experts and 2,000 direct sales representatives. Medline operates over 50 distribution centers across North America.

In October 2023, Jim Boyle became Medline CEO. In December 2025, Medline completed an initial public offering, listing on Nasdaq at $29 per share, raising more than $6.26 billion and valuing the company at over $37 billion.

On June 11, 2026, a fire destroyed a Medline distribution center in Tracy, California. The incident was reported to be one of the largest warehouse fires in the history of the United States and the building was deemed a total loss. The cause of the fire remains under investigation.

== Lawsuits ==
=== False Claims Act ===
In October 2007, former employee Sean Mason filed a qui tam suit on behalf of the United States against Medline, alleging violations of the False Claims Act and the Illinois Whistleblower Reward and Protection Act. The complaint alleged that Medline provided bribes and kickbacks to healthcare providers, designated certain customers as "tracking customers" in federal procurement contracts while offering them lower prices than those offered to the federal government, and overbilled the federal government's mail-order pharmacy program. The complaint remained under seal while the U.S. government and the state of Illinois considered whether to intervene; both declined. In 2011, Medline settled the case for $85 million, with Mason receiving $23.4 million.

=== Ethylene oxide ===
Ethylene oxide (EtO) is used to sterilize medical equipment and is classified as a known carcinogen. In 2017, Medline released 2,863 pounds of EtO. Medline later received a permit from the Illinois Environmental Protection Agency to construct controls intended to reduce EtO emissions to below 150 pounds per year. In 2019, four Lake County residents filed a lawsuit against Medline alleging that emissions of EtO from the company's facility caused their cancers and that the company failed to take adequate steps to reduce emissions. Additional plaintiffs later filed lawsuits alleging harms including cancer, birth defects, and miscarriages. In 2022, an appeals court ruled that a Chicago insurer was not required to cover Medline in litigation over EtO emissions because the insurance policy began in 2008, after the alleged emissions had begun in 1994.

In 2023, Medline filed suit against its insurers, National Union Fire and Marine Insurance Company and National Union Fire Insurance Company of Pittsburgh, while seeking to settle the EtO litigation. Medline alleged that the insurers had refused to honor indemnity obligations related to the lawsuits. As of early 2025, the litigation remained pending.

=== Labor relations ===
Over several decades, charges have been filed against Medline with the National Labor Relations Board. In September 2015, Medline terminated a warehouse operator at its Shepherdsville, Kentucky, distribution facility. The employee alleged that the termination was related to protected labor organizing activities. Medline later settled the case for $15,000, with the employee agreeing not to return to work.
