= The Million-Year Centipede, or, Liquid Structures =

2007 novel by Eckhard Gerdes

The Million-Year Centipede
- Author: Eckhard Gerdes
- Cover artist: Jennifer C. Barnes
- Language: English
- Series: None
- Genre: Science fiction, fantasy, horror, Bizarro, Postmodernism, experimental fiction
- Publisher: Raw Dog Screaming Press
- Publication date: 2007
- Publication place: USA
- Media type: Print
- Pages: 125
- ISBN: 978-1-933293-35-6
- OCLC: 237816760
- Preceded by: Przewalski's Horse (Red Hen Press, 2006)
- Followed by: Nin and Nan, My Landlady the Lobotomist

The Million-Year Centipede, or, Liquid Structures (2007) is the sixth novel by American author Eckhard Gerdes. Set in an apocalyptic world in which a giant centipede comes to collect all of the true rock ‘n’ roll fans, Gerdes’ book is built of text fragments, drawings and songs that deal with themes like hero worship and fundamentalism. Like much of Gerdes’ work, The Million-Year Centipede is non-linear in structure, but is distinguished by its use of allegory.

== Cover description ==
“Wakelin, frontman of seminal rock group The Hinge, once wrote a poem so prophetic that to ignore its wisdom is to doom yourself to drown in blood. After realizing the power of his words he faked his own death. Now one obsessed fan is tracking Wakelin down…can he be found before it’s too late?”
