= New Trier High School =

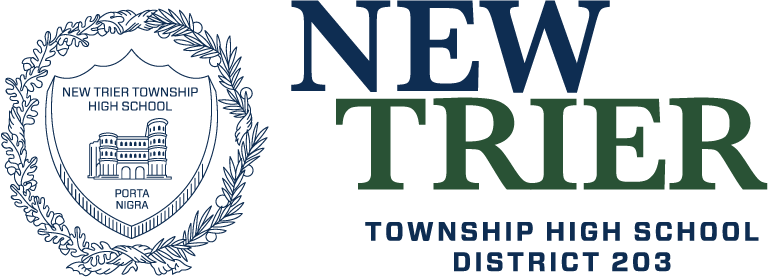

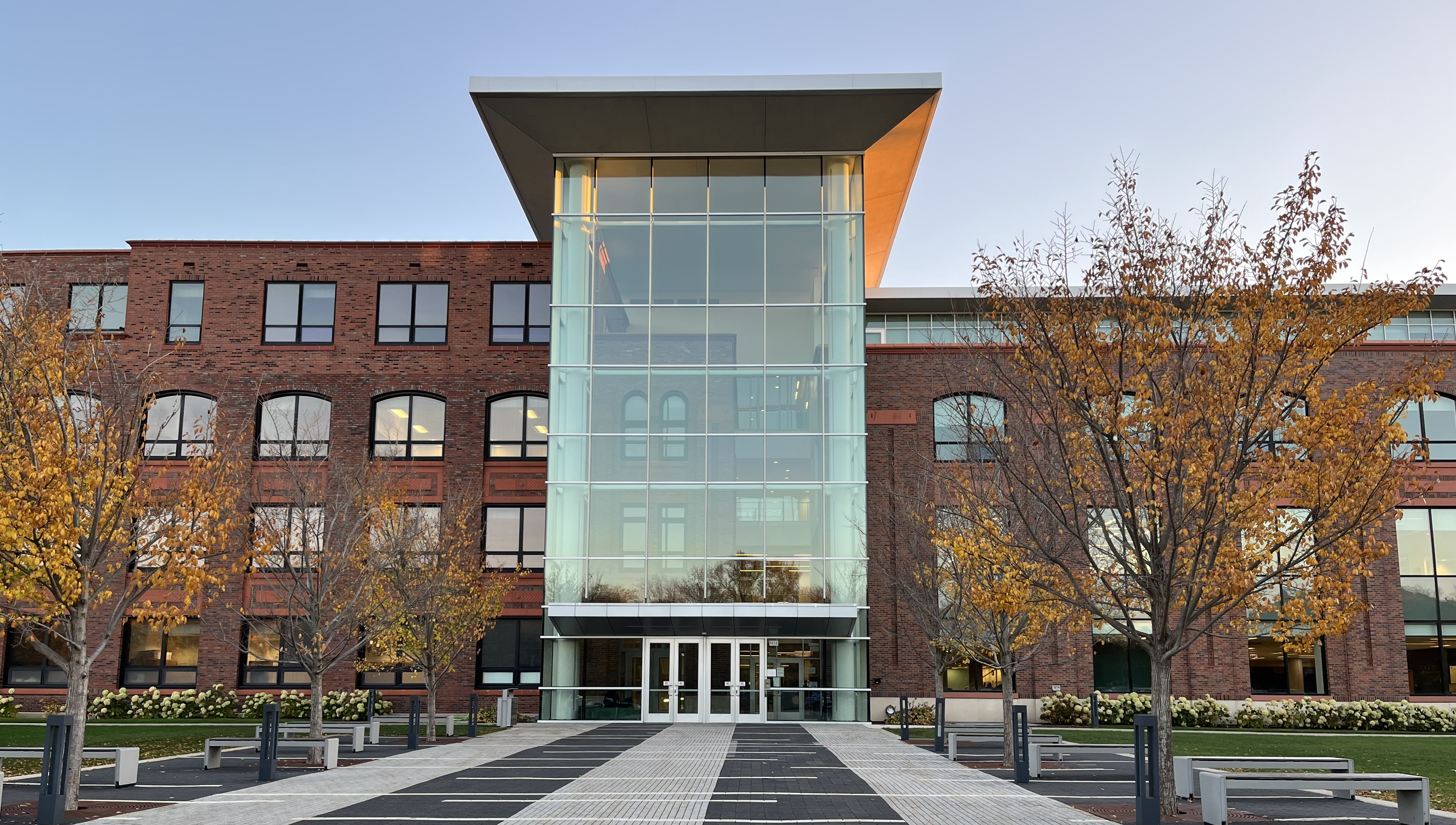
- Main campus, Winnetka

Location
- 385 Winnetka Avenue; Winnetka, Illinois 60093; United States; 42.09454°N 87.71914°W (Winnetka); 42.09088°N 87.76478°W (Northfield)

Information
- School type: Public secondary
- Motto: "To commit minds to inquiry, hearts to compassion, and lives to the service of humanity."
- Established: 1901
- School district: New Trier Township High School District 203
- Superintendent: Peter Tragos
- CEEB code: 144430
- Principal: Denise Dubravec (Winnetka); Paul Waechtler (Northfield)
- Teaching staff: 339
- Grades: 9–12
- Enrollment: 3,700 (2024)
- Average class size: 21
- Campus type: Suburban
- Colors: Blue; Green Grey
- Athletics conference: Central Suburban League
- Mascot: Trevius Maximus
- Nickname: Trevians
- Rival: Evanston Township High School; Loyola Academy; Watseka High School
- SAT average: 1204
- Newspaper: New Trier News
- Yearbook: Trevia
- Nobel laureates: Jack Steinberger (Physics, 1988)
- Website: www.newtrier.k12.il.us

New Trier High School (/trɪər/; also known as New Trier Township High School or NTHS) is a public four-year high school whose main campus for sophomores through seniors is in Winnetka, Illinois, with a campus in Northfield, Illinois, for first-year classes and district administration. Founded in 1901, the school serves the Chicago suburbs of Wilmette, Kenilworth, Winnetka, Glencoe, and Northfield, as well as parts of Northbrook, Glenview, and unincorporated Cook County. New Trier's seal depicts the Porta Nigra, a symbol of Trier, Rhineland-Palatinate, Germany. The athletic teams are known as the Trevians, the demonym for the people of Trier.

== Campuses ==
New Trier Township High School has three campuses. The western campus, New Trier Northfield is located in Northfield, Illinois. It serves freshman students. New Trier has an eastern campus near Lake Michigan called the Winnetka Campus in Winnetka, Illinois which serves sophomore through senior students. New Trier opened a third campus in Glencoe, Illinois in 2023 called the Transition Campus which provides students with disabilities "transitional and vocational" training.

== History ==
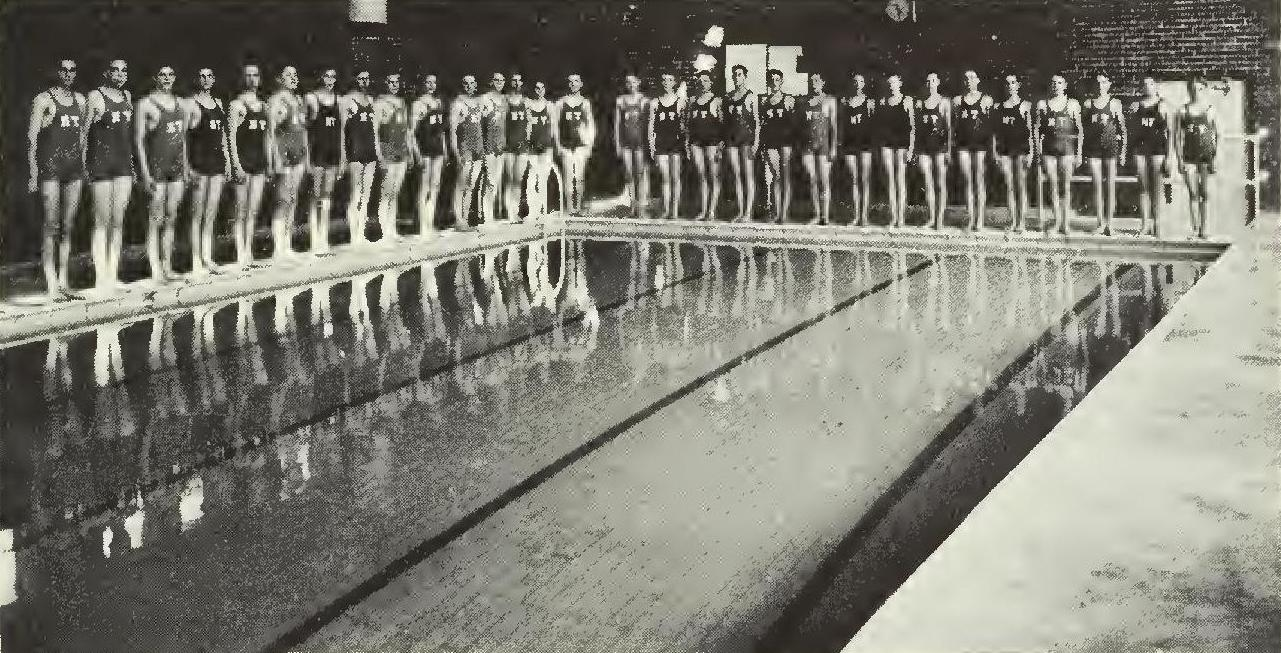
New Trier was the first high school in the United States with an indoor swimming pool.

New Trier High School opened on February 4, 1901, welcoming 76 students. In 1913, it became the first American high school with an indoor swimming pool.

The first edition of The New Trier News was published in 1920. In 1934, the track and field team won the school's first IHSA state championship (as of 2023, New Trier leads all Illinois high schools in athletic state championships). In 1965, the New Trier West Campus (which, as of 2023, serves the school's first-year students) opened in the village of Northfield.

In the 1950s, New Trier became the first U.S. high school with an educational, non-commercial FM broadcast license for a radiated station (WNTH, 88.1 FM). By 1970, New Trier was home to the nation's first public high school-based CCTV instructional station, ITV, which broadcast educational programming to township elementary schools via microwave signals. Students operated WNTH under a faculty advisor, and ITV was run by students under professional television technical and programming staff.

By 1962, student enrollment was more than 4,000. Some 20 "temporary" trailer classrooms lined the rear of the building, which had been designed for 3,000. To accommodate the growing baby boomer student body, voters approved a referendum for New Trier to purchase 46 acres of land in Northfield. Chicago architecture firm Perkins and Will was selected to design a campus of curricular buildings clustered around a central library and administration building. The resulting modernist design was widely noted in secondary education architecture literature and practice and emulated by Winnetka's Carleton Washburne junior high school several years later.

"New Trier West" opened to first- and second-year students in 1965. What had been "New Trier", at 385 Winnetka Avenue in Winnetka, became "New Trier East". In 1967, New Trier West was dedicated as a separate four-year high school. U.S. Secretary of Health, Education, and Welfare John Gardner keynoted the dedication, which was also attended by U.S. Senator Charles Percy (class of 1937) and Congressman Donald Rumsfeld (class of 1950).

Enrollment reached an all-time peak of 6,558 students in 1972. By 1981, enrollment had dropped significantly. As a result, the school board combined the East and West schools and converted New Trier West into a freshman-only campus. The division of first-year students (at the former New Trier West) from upper-level students (at the former New Trier East) lasted from 1981 to 1985. By then, enrollment had declined enough for the board to bring all students under one roof, close the former New Trier West, and convert the Northfield campus into a community recreation space. The campus later housed a senior center, corporate dormitories, a public swimming pool, and an alternative high school program known as West Center Academy.

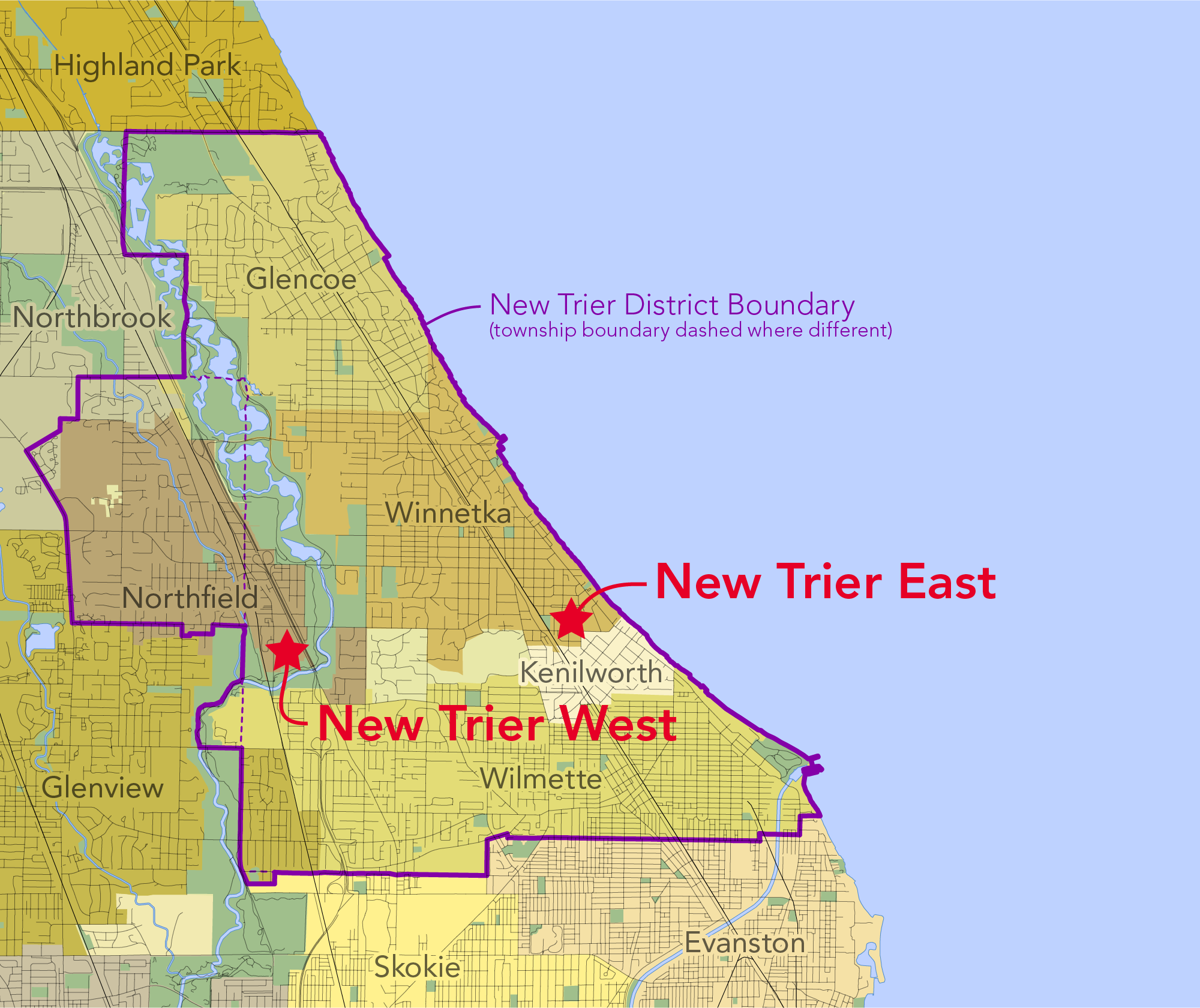
New Trier district and locations

The 1987-88 New Trier School Board proposed selling the New Trier West Campus in Northfield to facilitate a $10–12 million renovation project at the East Campus. Their decision to sell the property was based on a demographer's report and a reluctance to raise property taxes to cover the NT East revamp. The demographer, however, expressed caution about relying on predictions that exceeded ten years, stating in part that "... after 10 years, greater risk emerges of unanticipated events invalidating even the most scientifically-based projection methods." Concerned about another spike in (school) population and the need to retain the 42.5 acre Campus for future generations, local citizen advocates formed "The Coalition for the Future of New Trier". In March 1988, the Coalition forced the issue to a referendum, which, backed by broad community support, successfully ratified the Coalition's position. The Campus was retained and subsequently rented to various entities until it was again needed as additional space for a growing NT student population. According to research, the combined New Trier enrollment took less than two decades to exceed 4,000 students. The Coalition has never been acknowledged publicly for its significant role as a catalyst in retaining the 42.5-acre New Trier West Campus.

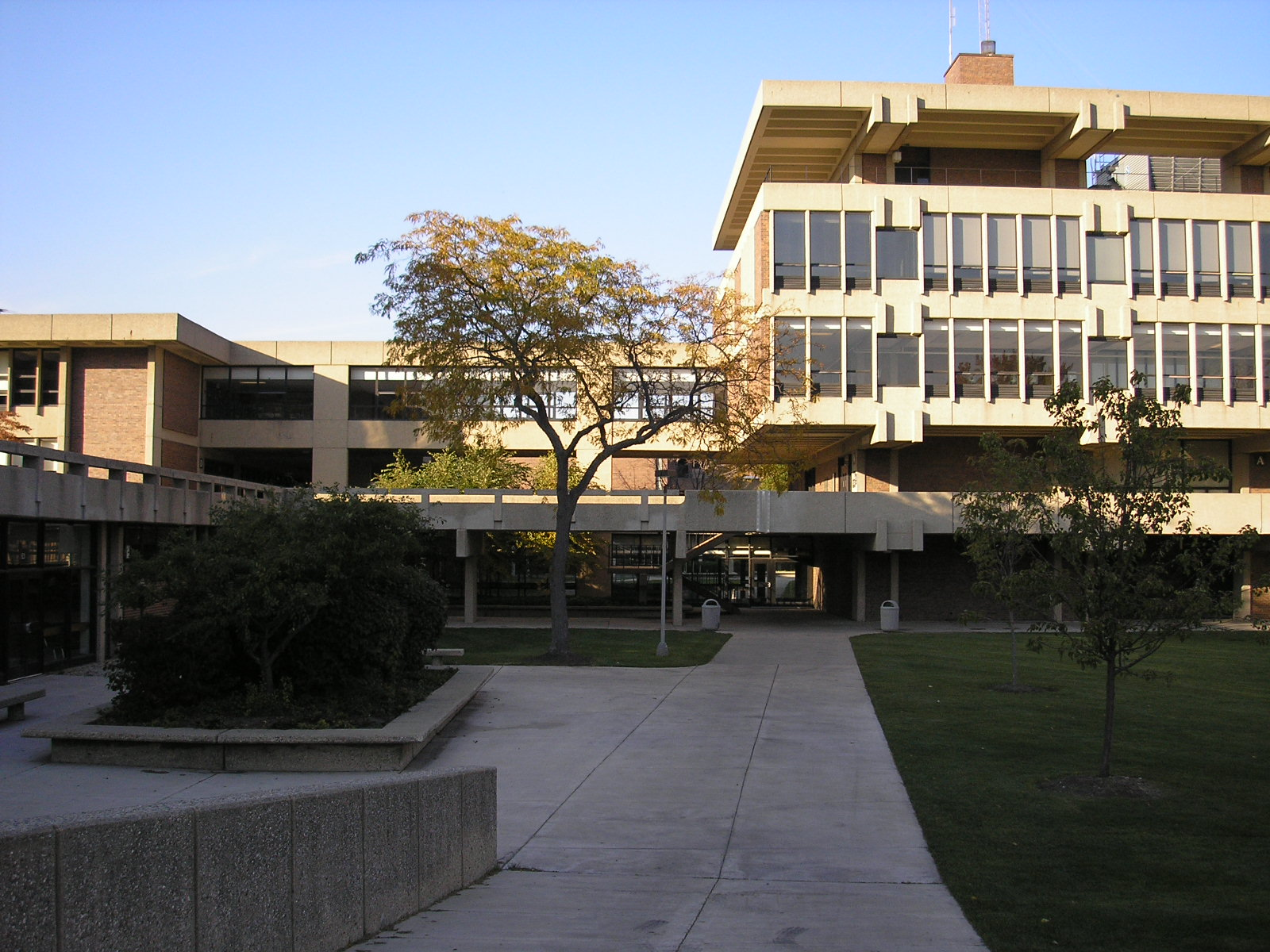
(New Trier Northfield): Freshman campus in Northfield, Illinois

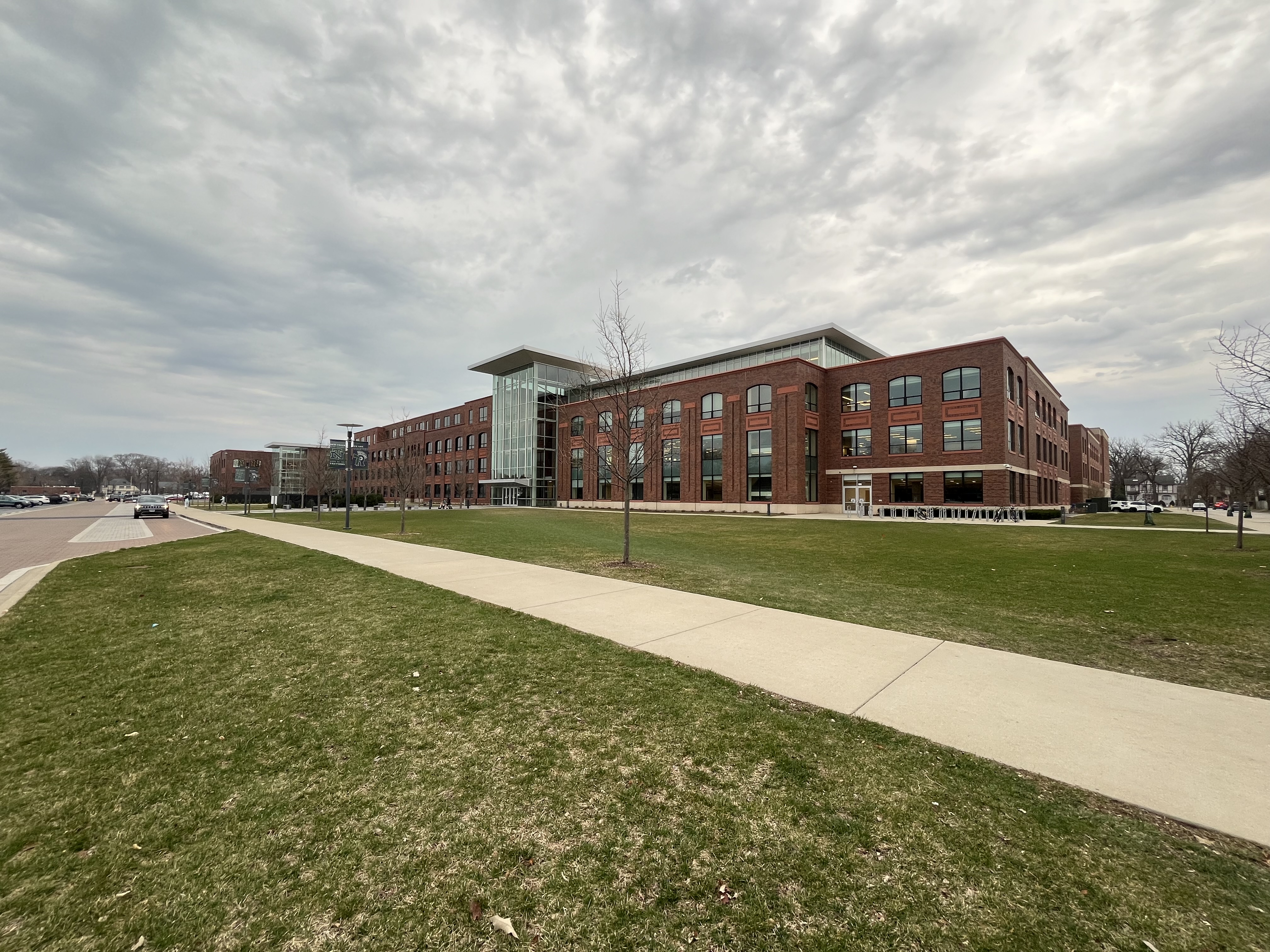
(New Trier Winnetka): Sophomore-senior campus in Winnetka, Illinois

In 2017, the school neared completion of a $104.9 million renovation and addition project at its East Campus, which replaced three aging buildings on the west side of the campus with the addition of a new student cafeteria, a new library, more than two dozen classrooms for core English, math, social studies, language and business program classes, new art labs, applied arts classroom spaces in the basement for STEM (science, technology, engineering, and math) programming, space for the school's radio and broadcasting programming, two green roofs, and two new theaters.

In 2023 New Trier opened a new $75 million, state-of-the-art, four-level athletic complex designed to support student-athletes year-round. The building features a quarter-mile, six-lane indoor track surrounding a turf infield with retractable batting cages, modern locker rooms and training spaces, a large competition gym seating 1,800 spectators with a high-tech videoboard, an auxiliary gym, expansive weight and fitness centers, and dedicated spaces for climbing and outdoor education programs. Designed for versatility and high usage, the facility accommodates a wide range of sports and physical education activities while creating an energetic, athlete-centered environment that honors the legacy of the original Gates Gym through preserved architectural and historical elements.

== Governance ==
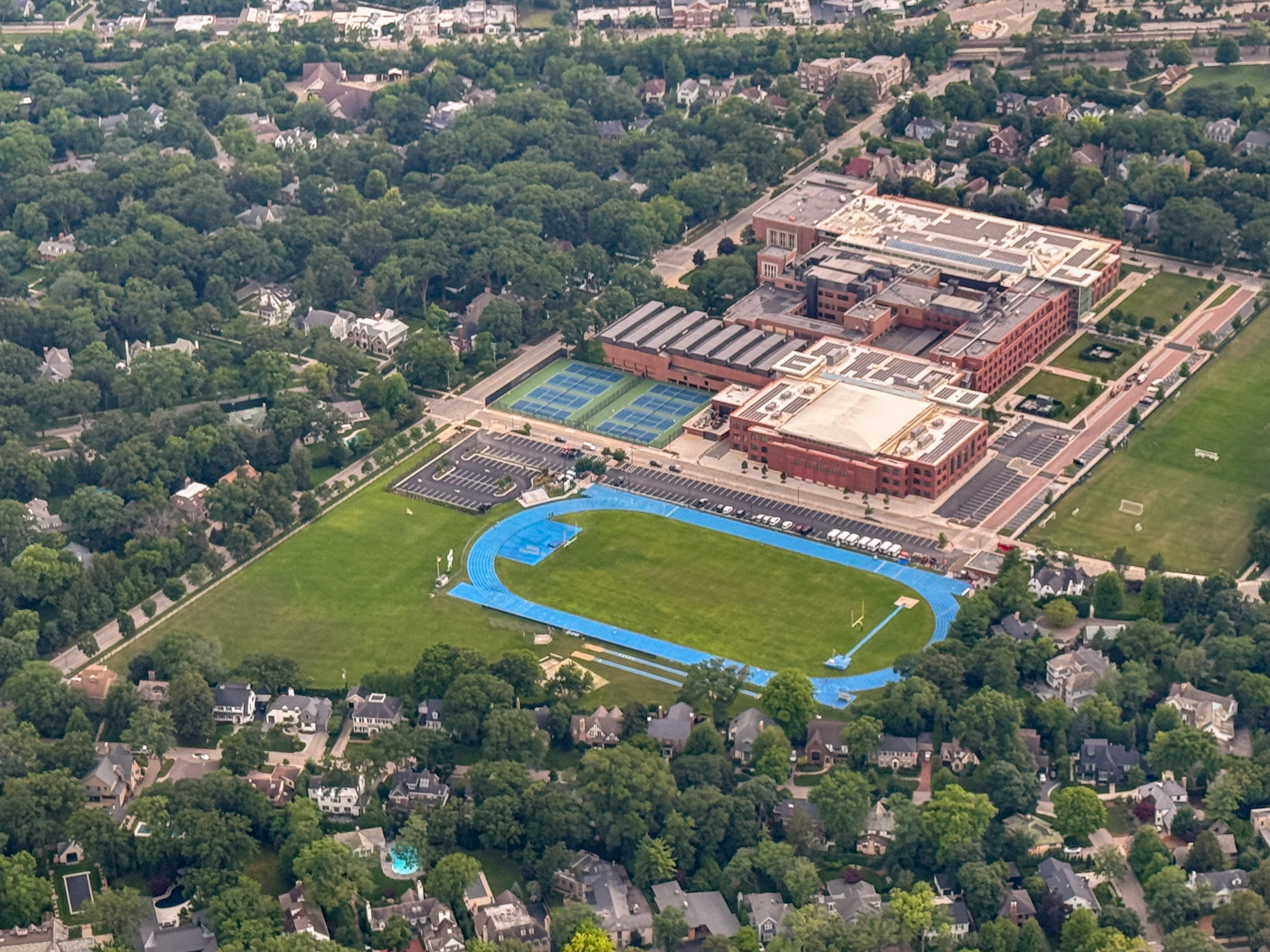
Aerial view

New Trier's current superintendent is Dr. Peter Tragos, who was selected by the Board of Education in November 2024. Tragos, the school's seventh superintendent since 1931, succeeded Dr. Paul Sally, who served as superintendent from 2017 to 2025. He replaced Dr. Linda L. Yonke, the first woman to hold the position, at the end of June 2017.

New Trier has a seven-member elected school board.

=== Recent superintendents ===
Superintendent	Years
Peter Tragos	2025 – Present
Paul Sally	2017 – 2025
Linda Yonke	2006 – 2017
Henry “Hank” Bangser	1990 – 2006

== Admissions ==
In the 2021–22 academic year, New Trier had an enrollment of 2,995 students in grades 10-12 and a student-teacher ratio of 11.7 to 1. Most of the students come from middle or upper-class families, with 3% of students from poor households (measured by how many qualify for free/reduced-price lunch).

Most students identify as white (77%), while 10% are Asian, 7% are Hispanic, and 5% are multiracial. Less than one percent of the student body is Black, American Indian, Alaska Native, or Native Hawaiian/Pacific Islander.

On the freshman campus, were 894 students enrolled in 2021–22. The student-teacher ratio is somewhat lower, at 10.5 to 1. Demographically, the student body is similar to the main campus: 75% of students are white, 10% are Asian, 9% are Hispanic, and 6% are multiracial, with members of other groups accounting for less than 1 percent. 3% of students come from households with income below the income threshold for subsidized school lunches.

== Curriculum ==
New Trier has practiced subject-level grouping since the 1956-1957 school year. In this system, up to four different levels of difficulty are offered for each academic subject. Level 2E is considered a general level. Levels 2, 3 and 4 are college preparatory, honors, and high honors levels, respectively. Level 5 was reserved for Advanced Placement classes and other college-level classes, such as multivariable calculus and linear algebra, but that level was phased out beginning with the class of 2011. (All 5-level courses have since been counted as 4-level.) Students may work at different levels in different subjects. Other levels include 8 and 9. Level 8 classes are counted for elective credit and level 9 classes, a combination of level 2, 3, and 4 students (i.e. 2+3+4=9) are graded as level 3 classes.

New Trier offers unweighted and weighted grade point averages (GPA); plus and minus grades are reported on transcripts. In calculating a weighted GPA, grades in a student's coursework are given different values depending on the level in which the grade is earned. For example, an "A" in a 2-level course is weighted at 4.00, while in levels 3 and 4, the values are 4.67 and 5.33, respectively (an "A" in a 5-level AP class was worth 5.67). In 2009, New Trier announced that for the 2010–2011 school year, the level 5 will be eliminated. A.P. classes will be weighted to level 4.

Since the late 1990s, the Board of Education has been examining how to encourage students to pursue a strong academic career without focusing too much on their class rank. The first step taken by the administration was to eliminate the process of reporting class rank and switch to decile ranking. Around the same time, the scale for weighted GPA calculations was modified, and plus and minus grades were implemented. In 2008, New Trier eliminated the reporting of ranks in a class entirely.

== Awards and recognition ==
In 2006, New Trier spent over $15,000 yearly per student, well above the then-state average of $8,786. It has been included in the "Top Hundred" and "Most Successful" lists of the National Association of Secondary School Principals, The New York Times, The Washington Post, and Parade magazine. The school was identified as "quite possibly the best public school in America" by Town & Country, in a six-page article on New Trier that cited the "rich" and "demanding" curriculum, extensive arts and activities, strong participation in athletics, and faculty of the caliber typically found teaching at good colleges. Life also recognized New Trier as one of the best high schools in America with cover stories in 1950 and 1998.

In 2016, Newsweek magazine ranked New Trier as the top open-enrollment high school in Illinois and the 17th best high school in the country.

In the class of 2024, 33 students were National Merit finalists, 36 were National Merit semifinalists, 79 received letters of commendation, and 365 were Illinois State Scholars. For this same class, the average composite ACT score was 27.5. The class of 2018 scored an average 28.0 composite on the ACT, the highest ever for New Trier and the highest in Illinois for open enrollment schools. According to an article by the University of Michigan Department of Psychology, "New Trier students outperform their Illinois classmates on every conceivable measure." The article also points out that 92% of the school's funding comes from the high property taxes of its affluent surroundings. Approximately 98% of the class of 2014 went on to enroll in college.

New Trier ensembles or individuals have received 39 awards in the Downbeat Student Music Awards program. A record-setting seven of these were achieved in 2007 alone. More than 1,100 students participate in the music department. The student-run Soundtraks Club produces all 24 concerts a year, webcast live on the internet at ntjazz.com, on local cable television, and in stereo on WNTH radio.

New Trier was named a Grammy Signature School Gold recipient by the Grammy Foundation in 2000 for its commitment to music education, and was named the National Signature School in 2007 as the nation's top high school music program. In April 2006, the school's Concert Choir and Symphony Orchestra performed in New York City at Carnegie Hall. In the summer of 2000, the school's Jazz Ensemble, Chamber Orchestra, and Bluegrass Band enjoyed a successful two-week concert tour of China.

== Extracurricular activities ==
There are over 150 different extracurricular activities at New Trier, including clubs related to academics, politics, dance, theater, arts, STEM, games, business, and service.

=== Athletics ===
Official logo of the New Trier Trevians

New Trier's mascot is the Trevian, named after soldiers from the city of Trier, Germany, during the Roman Empire. The Trevian mascot was chosen to recognize that immigrants from Trier, Germany, largely settled the Grosse Pointe area of Wilmette.From 1901 to 1948, the school's sports teams were known as the "Terriers" and "Green Wave." During the 1948–49 school year, they were renamed "Indians", reflecting the school's location in the Indian Hill section of Winnetka. When the new campus in the western part of the district opened in 1965, the new school's sports team was known as the "Cowboys". The year before the two schools merged in 1981, several student forums were held on both the East and West campuses, allowing students to provide feedback on potential school colors and nicknames. After a series of student votes, the school adopted "Trevians" as a team name and green, blue, and gray as the school colors (East having previously been green and gray, while West was blue, gray, and white). During the 2004–2005 school year, the mascot was named "Trevius Maximus" after conducting a student poll.

With more than 120 team state championships, New Trier High School has more than any other high school in Illinois. New Trier also leads the state in both boys' and girls' state titles. The sports in which New Trier has the most IHSA-sponsored state titles are boys' swimming and diving (24), boys' tennis (23), girls' swimming and diving (16), boys' golf (12), girls' tennis (12), girls' badminton (8), and girls' golf (7). New Trier has been strong in the sport of baseball, twice as state champions, winning in 2000 and 2009. New Trier East won the state chess championship and New Trier West was the runner-up in 1975, the year that chess became an official IHSA sport and New Trier West won again in 1979.

New Trier has also historically been strong at non-IHSA sponsored sports, including 18 Great Lakes High School Fencing Conference (formerly Midwest High School Fencing) championships in men's fencing and 10 in women's fencing, 18 state titles (Blackhawk Cup) in boys' ice hockey, 12 state championships in boys' lacrosse, 10 state titles in girls' ice hockey, 20 national championships in boys' rowing, seven national championships in girls' rowing, nine state championships in girls' field hockey, six state championships in girls' lacrosse, and one state championship in girls' cross country. The top varsity ice hockey team for boys, New Trier Green, won the first ever USA Hockey High School National Championship title in 2010, and repeated as champions in 2011.

In May 2005, New Trier was ranked #12 in Sports Illustrated's list of the "Top 25 High School Sports Programs in America," and first in Illinois.

The baseball team finished in third place in Class 4A in 2023.

=== Science Olympiad ===
New Trier Science Olympiad is recognized as one of the leading Science Olympiad teams in the United States. The team secured 8th place at the 2024 National Tournament after winning the state tournament. Having won state 16 times, New Trier has consistently demonstrated excellence, qualifying for the national tournament every year since 2002. Their record includes 22 consecutive top two finishes at the state level and 14 top 10 finishes at the national level. Beyond these team achievements, New Trier students frequently earn individual accolades, having collectively won nearly 100 national medals since 2002.

=== New Trier Swim Club ===
The New Trier Swim Club (NTSC) is nationally recognized for swimming excellence and the development of young adult leaders in athletics and education. NTSC swimmers compete at the national level of swimming, including the 2004 and 2008 Olympic Trials. The NTSC has consistently placed in the top 5 of all teams in the state of Illinois, and has been recognized by USA Swimming as a Silver Medal Club for the past four years.

=== Lagniappe-Potpourri ===
New Trier's Lagniappe-Potpourri is an annual student-written, student-choreographed, student-composed, student-directed, student-managed, student-built, and student-performed variety show. The show began as two separate productions, Lagniappe and Potpourri, at the east and west campuses respectively. In 1981, the two campuses combined, causing the two shows to merge into Lagniappe-Potpourri.

=== Journalism ===
Founded in 1919, the New Trier News is the school's student-run publication. Currently, the paper is published online and four times during the school year. New Trier also has several other minor student publications, including the New Trier Political Journal, Calliope, the school's art magazine, and Logos, the school's literary magazine.

=== Debate ===
New Trier's debate program has flourished in recent years, with two students receiving the top speaker award at the Tournament of Champions, which only allows the top 72 teams in the nation to compete through a system of qualifiers. The school has also had teams placed in the top 16 in recent years. New Trier has had students either go to the final or win in the Illinois High School Association's state debate tournament in all four divisions, winning the 2011 and 2013 championship in Public Forum. In 2017 they won the championship in Lincoln-Douglas debate.

=== Philanthropy ===
Each of the four official class governments (Sophomore and Junior Steering Committees and the Freshman and Senior Senates) makes significant annual donations to various philanthropic causes throughout the community, state, country, and world. Every year since 2001, the Senior Senate has fully funded the construction of a house in conjunction with Habitat for Humanity of Lake County, Illinois, a non-profit organization that fights homelessness and substandard housing. A recent goal of the campaign was ten houses in 10 years, and the class of 2010 fulfilled that goal. New Trier is the only school to build 10 houses with Habitat. Many fundraisers contribute to this and various other causes over the academic year. The New Trier Tsunami Relief Committee donated more than $18,000 to relief organizations to save people affected by the tsunami; it also helped victims of the Indian Ocean tsunami in December 2004.

=== Frank Mantooth Jazz Festival ===
The jazz festival began in 1983 and takes place on the first Saturday of February. Each year, the event brings in around fifty high school and junior high jazz ensembles from the Great Lakes region and Canada to perform during the day. The high school groups attend clinics with jazz educators and composers nationwide. Seminars are also held throughout the day on improvisation, transcription, music business, and instrument masterclasses. A jazz combo and college big band perform in the afternoon, while the evening concert features New Trier's top jazz ensemble and a professional big band. Past groups have included the Buddy Rich Big Band (led by Dave Weckl), the Woody Herman Orchestra, the Count Basie Orchestra, the Artie Shaw Orchestra, the Duke Ellington Orchestra, the Toshiko Akiyoshi-Lew Tabackin Jazz Orchestra, the Vanguard Jazz Orchestra, the Chicago Jazz Ensemble (led by Jon Faddis), the Bob Mintzer Big Band, Gordon Goodwin's Big Phat Band, the Mingus Big Band, Maynard Ferguson, Dizzy Gillespie, Delfeayo Marsalis, and Wynton Marsalis. The festival was renamed in 2005 after Frank Mantooth when the jazz musician, educator, and composer died just days before the 2004 festival.

== In popular culture ==
Scenes from Uncle Buck and Home Alone were shot at the high school's west campus in Northfield.
