= Robert J. Egan (Illinois politician) =

American politician

Robert J. Egan (November 11, 1931 – September 15, 2003) was an American politician, lawyer, and judge.

Egan was born in Chicago, Illinois. He went to the Loyola Academy and served in the United States Army during the Korean War. Egan received his bachelor's degree from St. Norbert College and his law degree from Loyola University Chicago in 1958. He served as an assistant trial judge in the Chicago Municipal Court System and in the office of the Illinois Attorney General. Egan served in the Illinois Senate from 1971 to 1973 and from 1975 to 1984. He was a Democrat. In 1995 and 1996, Egan served as an Illinois Circuit Court judge for Cook County, Illinois. Egan died from stomach cancer at his home in Chicago, Illinois.
