= Predix (software) =

Industrial machine software platform

Predix (Predix Platform)
- Original author: GE Digital
- Developer: GE Digital
- Website: www.ge.com/digital/iiot-platform

Predix was an industrial IoT software PaaS developed by GE Digital, the software and services division of General Electric, that provided edge-to-cloud data connectivity and analytics and services to support industrial applications. Although initially considered a pioneering move by GE in the IoT and Industry 4.0 space, the platform came to be widely regarded as a critical failure for GE's digital business and chief contributing factor in the breakup of the GE conglomerate as a whole in 2024.

Over the course of Predix' development and launch, GE invested over $7 billion into consulting teams, hiring and training software developers, and additional support services for the platform, with then-GE Chief Digital Officer Bill Ruh forecasting in 2016 that the software business, with Predix at the helm, would generate at least $15 billion in revenue by 2020.
Due to a mixture of overreliance on expensive external consulting teams, overhiring, primarily marketing Predix to internal business units rather than targeting external customers, poor synergy between Predix and existing business units, lack of unifying vision and collaboration, and struggles within GE to adapt from industrial manufacturing to a Silicon Valley startup culture, the platform failed to perform as predicted.
In 2021, GE CEO Larry Culp announced the breakup of GE, with GE Digital being absorbed into GE Vernova in 2023 in advance of the spinoff the following year.
In 2022, the Predix name was retired, and key elements of it were relegated to a smaller role within the software business, rebranded under the cloud-based Asset Performance Management suite.

== Overview ==
Predix Platform collected and transferred OT and IT data to the cloud by direct connector software or Predix Edge – an on-premises software product that also supported local analytics and applications processing. Predix Edge deployments could be managed at the local level and/or centrally from Predix Cloud.

In addition to data ingestion, processing and storage, Predix Platform provided a framework for operationalizing streaming and batch analytics processing.

Predix Essentials was a packaged and pre-configured version of the Predix Platform intended to immediately support GE Digital applications and typical IIoT use cases such as condition-based monitoring.

In November 2016, Forrester Research said GE Digital's Predix was one of eleven significant IoT packages.
