= Dart Container =

World's largest manufacturer of foam cups and containers

Dart Container Corporation
- Type: Private
- Industry: Single-use food service packaging
- Founded: 1960
- Founder: William A. Dart
- Headquarters: Mason, Michigan
- Number of locations: 45 production, distribution, and office facilities
- Key people: Robert C. Dart, CEO
- Products: Foam food service products; Plastic cups & containers; Paper cups
- Revenue: ▲$3 Billion (2019)
- Number of employees: 15,000
- Website: dartcontainer.com

Dart Container Corporation is an American manufacturer of disposable food containers. Based in Mason, Michigan, Dart is the world's largest manufacturer of foam cups and containers, producing about as many as all competitors combined. Dart Container is privately held by the Dart family.

In May 2012, Dart acquired Illinois-based Solo Cup Company and now has approximately 15,000 employees and more than 45 production, distribution center, and office locations in eight countries.

== Company history ==
Dart Manufacturing Company was founded in 1937 by William F. Dart, a son of the founder of Dart National Bank. As a machine shop, it manufactured key rings, steel tape measures, and dog tags for the Department of Defense. It also created popular toy for kids, called Marble Race.

His son, William A. Dart, graduated from University of Michigan with three degrees (metallurgy, mathematics, and engineering) and joined the family business in the late 1950s. They experimented with and perfected an expandable polystyrene (EPS) molding process, and shipped their first insulated foam cups in April 1960. They first developed a 6 oz. cup before expanding to 8, 10, and 12 ounces. Dart Container Corporation was incorporated in 1963. Among Dart's first major clients was Chick-fil-A, Sysco, and US Foods. It also sold to hospitals, schools, and sports stadiums.

During the 1960s and '70s, Dart expanded to Pennsylvania, Illinois, California, and Texas. It also started making plastic dinnerware and cutlery. In 1980, it opened a facility in Horse Cave, Kentucky. In 1981, the company filed a patent for a more user-friendly lid. It was a plastic disc with a press-down tab that allowed customers to drink while the lid was still on. Dart opened a facility in Plant City, Florida, in 1983, and another in Lodi, California, in 1984. A facility in Campbellford, Ontario in Canada was opened in 1985. Kenneth Dart became president in 1986. In 1996, the company expanded to Mexico, opening a facility in Atlacumulco.

In 2006, Family Business Magazine ranked Dart Container 137th in its listing of family companies, with an estimated $1.1 billion in sales, and 4,950 employees. In 2007, Dart opened a facility in Tijuana, Mexico. At the time, the company had 7,500 employees and 16 million square feet of plant space worldwide.

In March 2012, Dart expanded its operations to Brazil when it acquired a facility in Pindamonhangaba. Dart Container purchased Solo Cup Company in May 2012 in a deal valued at approximately $1 billion. The iconic Solo red cup was slated to remain under the Solo name. Following the acquisition, Dart consolidated its operations in Canada, forming Dart Canada in 2014. At the time, the subsidiary employed 380 people and had facilities in Toronto and Campbellford, a corporate office in Toronto, and a Mississauga warehouse. It also completed a $60 million expansion project that updated its headquarters and opened a new distribution center in the same complex.

By 2013, Dart had 14,000 employees across 45 locations in 12 U.S. states and eight countries, including Canada, the United Kingdom, Mexico, Argentina, and Australia. That year, New York City passed a The company closed its Augusta, Georgia paper cup factory in 2019, citing a lack in demand. Production was then moved to Toronto. When Maryland banned the use of foam plastics, Dart closed its distribution centers in Hampstead and Havre de Grace. Operations were relocated to New Castle, Delaware.

In February 2020, Dart eliminated 6% of its administrative and sales workforce. During the COVID-19 pandemic in 2020, Dart produced thousands of plastic face shields for health care workers. In March 2023, the company announced the closure of its Tumwater facility in Washington. Its Urbana, Illinois facility was shut down at the end of the year, affecting 135 jobs. Dart eliminated 250 corporate jobs, including 160 from its Mason headquarters, in September 2024. It closed two plants and eliminated 175 jobs in California the following month in connection to the state's ban on expanded polystyrene.

== Operations ==
Dart Container Corporation is vertically integrated, allowing the company to reduce costs. Dart produces its own polystyrene resin, builds the machinery that processes the raw materials, manufactures its own ink and packaging film, and transports the finished products on trucks it owns.

Since the 1990s, Dart has also handled its own recycling efforts through foam recycling densifiers and collection programs. The foam products are heated and compressed, then shipped off to be reused as building material. The company has also established independent facilities to handle the cleaning and recycling of used products. Dart's Recycla-Pak program ran from the late 1990s until 2020, when it was stopped due to the COVID-19 pandemic. In 2023, the Next Life Take Back Program was announced as an enhanced replacement.

Since the 2010s, Dart has faced increased criticism over the environmental effects of its products. A decrease in polystyrene foam sales has led to the company producing more paper products for Starbucks and Dunkin' Donuts. By 2020, foam only made up a fifth of the company's total products, and sales of food and beverage containers were flat. It has also invested in compostable molded fiber as an additional alternative.

== Controversies ==
The company is owned by brothers Kenneth B. Dart and Robert C. Dart, who renounced their U.S. citizenship in 1994. Kenneth Dart then established a relationship with the nation of Belize, which promptly sought U.S. permission to open a consulate in Sarasota with Dart as its consul. The request was rejected by the State Department, and the brothers eventually moved to the Cayman Islands. They have several business concerns on the islands, including Dart Enterprises which is a holding company involved in several projects, including the Camana Bay town development.

In 2001, the US Internal Revenue Service said the Dart brothers improperly billed $11.6 million of personal security costs to Dart Container. In U.S. Tax Court, Dart Container argued the money was a valid business expense due to "specific threats and other facts and circumstances". Half the money went for corporate aircraft. The IRS asked for $4 million more for 1996 and 1997 taxes. In 2003, the Internal Revenue Service took the brothers to court, saying they owed an additional $19 million in 1998 and 1999 taxes. In 2002, the Dart brothers and their companies paid $26 million in back taxes.

In May 2013, fifty agents of the Argentine tax authority raided the local Dart Container subsidiary Dart Sudamericana SRL on alleged tax evasion charges. The tax authority claimed that the firm imported polystyrene beads at inflated prices, thus avoiding taxable gains through the unfair transfer pricing scheme.
