= Solo Cup Company =

American disposable tableware manufacturer

- Type: Subsidiary
- Founded: 1936
- Founder: Leo Hulseman
- Headquarters: Lake Forest, Illinois
- Products: Disposable cups
- Parent: Dart Container
- Website: solocup.com

Solo Cup Company is an American manufacturer of disposable consumer products including beverage cups, disposable plates, and bowls. Solo Cup Company is located in Lake Forest, Illinois, and in 2006 had sales of $2.4 billion. On May 4, 2012, Solo Cup Company was acquired by Dart Container.

== History ==
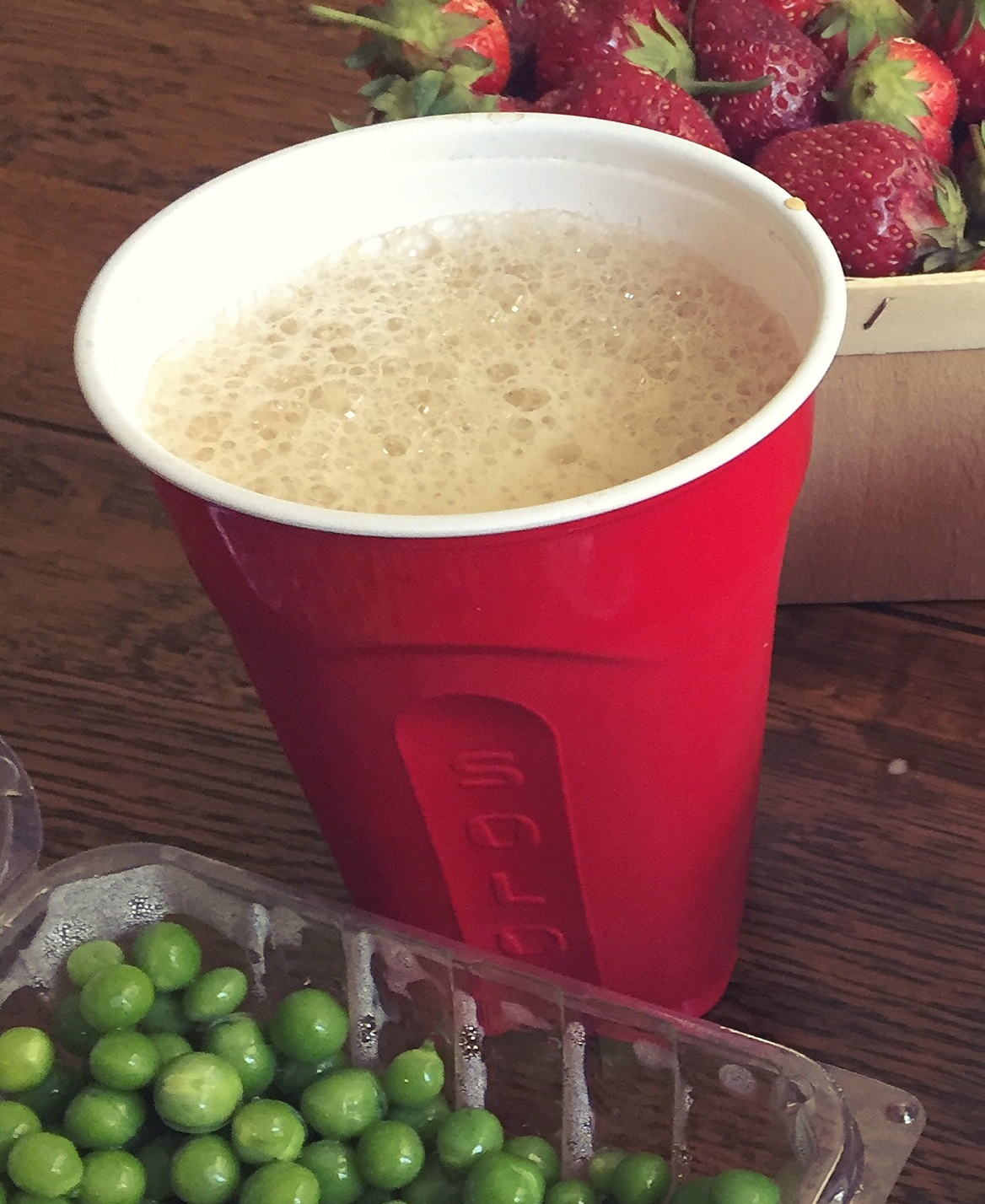
A basic 16 ounce (473 mL) Solo cup

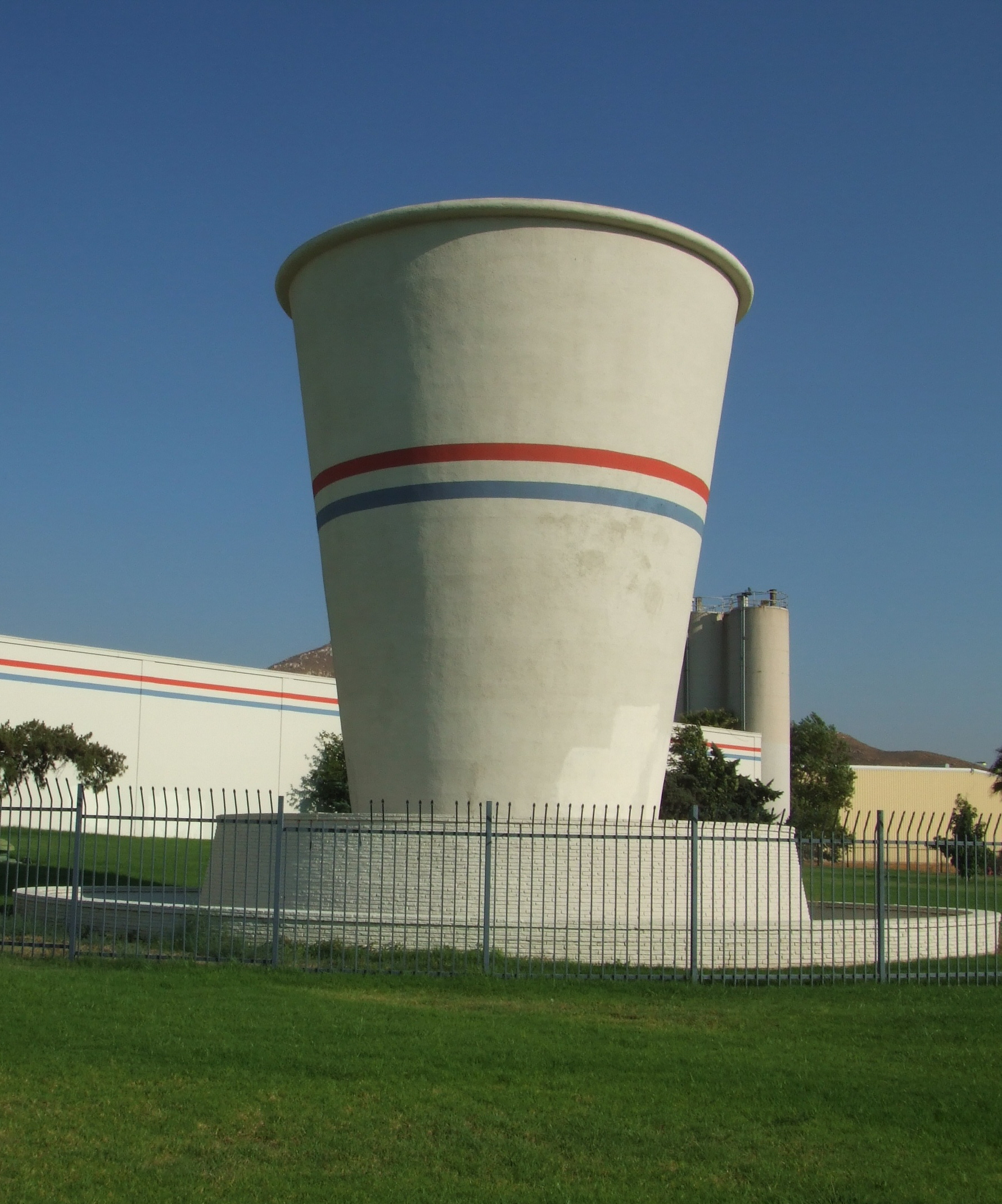
The world's largest "paper" cup in front of what was once the Lily-Tulip manufacturing company, later Sweetheart Cup Company which was in turn acquired by Solo. Actually made of poured concrete, the cup stands about 68.1 feet (20.8 m) tall.

Leo Hulseman, a former employee of the Dixie Co. in the 1930s, created a paper cone he made at his home and sold to bottled-water companies. His invention was part of a movement to move communities away from unsafe shared drinking devices and toward single-use containers for personal use. Formed in 1936 as Paper Container Manufacturing, its first facility was an old ice plant at 75th Street and East End Avenue in the South Shore neighborhood of Chicago.

To make the cups, Hulseman relied on an automatic paper-cup-making machine invented by George Method Merta. It could churn out 250 cups a minute from a roll of paper. It was Merta's wife, Bozena, who named the cup Solo, after its purpose as a one-use disposable container. He bought the machine from its inventor in 1940. The company found early success thanks to World War II. During the war, glass and labor were at a premium, so restaurants found it economical to use disposable cups.

Later the company developed other products. Wax-coated cups were added to its lineup in the 1950s, just as fountain sodas and drive-in movie theaters gained popularity. The Cozy Cup, a disposable, single-use insert placed inside a reusable coffee cup holder, was released in the 1960s.

In the 1970s, Hulseman's son, Robert Leo Hulseman, came up with the now-ubiquitous red Solo cup. It initially was produced in peach, yellow, and blue as well, but red sold best. The cups are made of thick, molded polystyrene. They are known for being able to withstand drops, easily stackable, and disposable while price accessible. Robert replaced his father as president in 1980. In 1986, the company filed a patent for its iconic Solo Traveler lid. It was designed to accommodate the nose and lip of a drinker, while also providing enough room for foamed drinks. In 1987, Solo gained Starbucks as a customer, supplying the coffee shop with plastic dome lids.

In 1998, Solo acquired Clear Shield National from Envirodyne Industries for $140 million. The unit made disposable plastic cutlery and drinking straws.

In 2000, Solo Cup Europe was established to sell products abroad. In 2001, Solo expanded into Asia with the purchase of Tokyo's Sanyo Pax Co. Ltd., in a deal worth more than $16 million. The company gained five manufacturing plants in Japan.

On March 1, 2004, Solo acquired Sweetheart Cup Company for $917.2 million, adding its Sweetheart cups, Hoffmaster napkins, and Fonda Brands plates to its portfolio. Vestar Capital Partners invested $240 million to fund the transaction, receiving a minority ownership stake in return. Three facilities in the Chicago area were closed and operations were consolidated. It also purchased the Sherri Cup Company in 2005, gaining ownership over the famous Anthora coffee cup design.

However, integration of Sweetheart proved difficult, and Solo struggled financially. The problems were compounded by an increase in the cost of fuel and raw material, like plastic resin. By March 2006, Solo Cup was $1.1 billion in debt. In August, Robert Hulseman stepped down as chief executive. His replacement removed several executives and uncovered accounting irregularities. Moody's and Standard & Poor's lowered the company's credit ratings. After three years of losses, Vestar took control of the company's board and removed Robert Hulseman as chairman at the end of the year. In 2007, Solo sold its Hoffmaster business to Kohlberg & Company for $170 million.

In 2008, Solo debuted its Bare line, which offered single-use products made of recycled, recyclable, compostable or renewable materials. Solo Cup Company closed its longstanding facility in Highland Park, Illinois, in December 2009 and relocated its headquarters to Lake Forest, Illinois.

In April 2010, Solo acquired take-out container manufacturer InnoWare Plastic Inc. for $24 million. Its line of specialty and custom-embossed take-out containers was rebranded as Creative Carryouts under new ownership. In June, Solo announced it would shut down Sweetheart's Owings Mills, Maryland facility in 2012. On May 4, 2012, Solo Cup Company was acquired by Dart Container for $1 billion.

== Advertising ==
=== Dora Hall ===
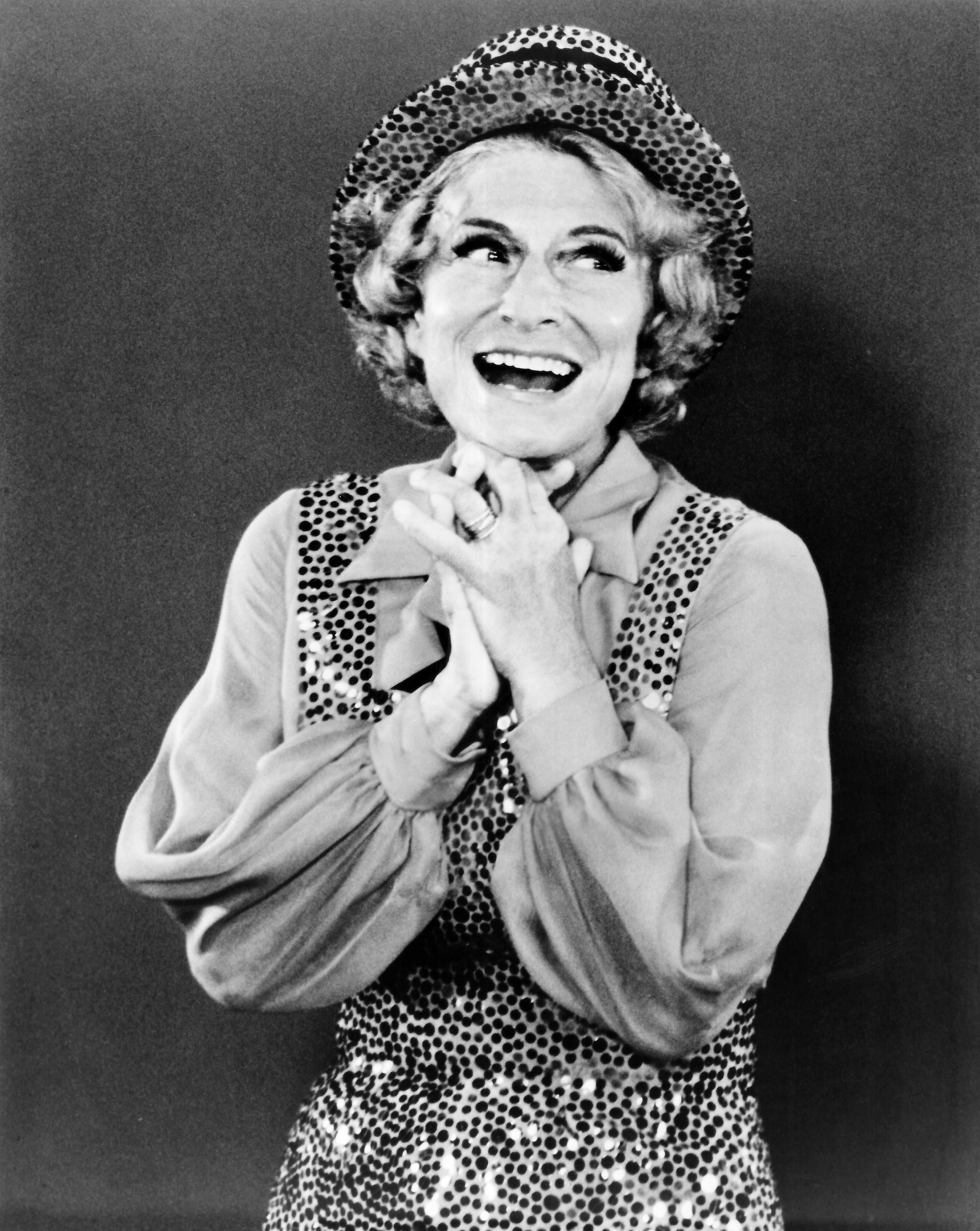
Dora Hall performing in the 1971 television special Once Upon a Tour.

The wife of company founder Leo Hulseman (1898–1989) was Dorothy Donahoe Hulseman (1900–1988), better known by her stage name Dora Hall. She was a vaudeville performer in her youth but returned to singing after she was diagnosed with breast cancer in 1959. Hulseman had her record 45 rpm records and packaged them with Solo cups as a promotion. At least one early record ("Hello Faithless", written by Felice and Boudleaux Bryant and arranged by Don Ralke) charted on various radio stations in the US, Canada, and the UK, although it failed to make the national charts in any country.

Solo Cup produced syndicated television specials in 1971 and 1979, starring Dora Hall alongside Frank Sinatra Jr., Rich Little, and Scatman Crothers. Hulseman used these shows to trade TV ads for shelf placement at grocery stores. Her songs are found on the Premore, Reinbeau, and Cozy Records labels.

=== Solo film ===
The 2018 Star Wars film Solo was given the codename Red Cup during production, in reference to the red Solo cup. The company's cups were also packaged with images from the movie. A scale model of the Millennium Falcon was created out of red Solo cups for the movie's premiere.

== Cultural significance ==
=== Red Solo cup ===
Over decades, the company's red Solo cup has become associated with underage drinking. The red plastic cups are notably used in American college and university games such as beer pong and flip cup. However, the company did not embrace this image, refusing to place red cups in movies or TV shows, and choosing not to package in ping pong balls or game rules. The company's "Up For Anything" campaign in the 2010s allowed Solo to split the difference and give all customers the experience they wanted.

There is a widely held belief, especially prevalent on the internet, that the horizontal rings on a traditional 16 ounce (originally 18 ounce) Solo cup are intended to represent the standard volume for various alcoholic drinks. Specifically, indentations at approximately 1, 5, and 12 ounce levels are believed to denote recommended pours for hard liquor, wine, and beer, respectively. However, Solo refutes this claim, stating that the markings are open to interpretation and noting that many of their cup designs do not have these specific indented rings. Additionally, Dart Container Corporation emphasizes the functionality of the lines in physical performance of the cups over unintended coincidental measurement lines.

The red party cup accounts for 60% of Solo party cup sales, outselling the blue variety by a wide margin. Solo has tweaked the design of its cup, adding indented grooves in 2003 and making its base squared in 2009. In part because of its cultural significance, many other manufacturers now produce similar looking red cups.

Solo Cup was offered an opportunity to acquire the novelty song "Red Solo Cup" but refused. Toby Keith ultimately went on to record the 2011 country music song "Red Solo Cup".

=== Other designs ===
The company is also known for its Jazz cup design, acquired through Sweetheart and sometimes known as "Solo Jazz". In 2004, the Museum of Modern Art in New York City added a Solo Cup Traveler's Lid to its "Humble Masterpieces" exhibit. The lid was featured because it symbolized innovation and progress in basic product design.

== See also ==
- "Red Solo Cup", a Toby Keith song named after the company
