= List of companies based in the Jacksonville area =

This is a list of companies either based or with large operation divisions in the Jacksonville/Northeast Florida area of the United States.

== Active companies headquartered in the region ==
Company Name	Location	Industry	Fortune 500 rank (2013)	Note
ABCoA	Jacksonville	Technology		
Acosta Sales and Marketing	Jacksonville	marketing		
All Elite Wrestling	Jacksonville	sports entertainment		
American Coolair Corporation	Jacksonville	Manufacturing		
Bubba Burger	Jacksonville	food		
Crowley Maritime	Jacksonville	transportation		
CSX Corporation	Jacksonville	transportation	231	NYSE: CSX
Dun & Bradstreet	Jacksonville	consulting		NYSE: DNB
Elkins Constructors	Jacksonville	construction		
Fanatics, Inc.	Jacksonville	retail		
Fidelity National Financial	Jacksonville	financial services	353	NYSE: FNF
FIS	Jacksonville	financial technology	474	NYSE: FIS
Firehouse Subs	Jacksonville	food		
Florida Blue	Jacksonville	insurance		
Florida East Coast Railway	Jacksonville	transportation		
Florida Coastal School of Law	Jacksonville	education		
Florida Times-Union	Jacksonville	media		
FRP Holdings	Jacksonville	transportation		Nasdaq: FRPH
Gate Petroleum	Jacksonville	conglomerate		
Haskell Company	Jacksonville	construction		
Interline Brands	Jacksonville	marketing		
Jacksonville Free Press	Jacksonville	media		
Jacksonville Jaguars	Jacksonville	sports franchise		
JEA	Jacksonville	utilities		
Landstar System, Inc.	Jacksonville	transportation		Nasdaq: LSTR
Larry's Giant Subs	Jacksonville	food		
Lender Processing Services	Jacksonville	information technology		
Mac Papers	Jacksonville	manufacturing		
Metro Jacksonville	Jacksonville	media		
Nymbus	Jacksonville	financial technology		
Rayonier	Jacksonville	real estate		NYSE: RYN
Patriot Rail Company LLC	Jacksonville	transportation		
Rayonier Advanced Materials	Jacksonville	accounting		NYSE: RYAM
Regency Centers	Jacksonville	real estate		NYSE: REG
Reynolds, Smith & Hills	Jacksonville	construction		
Ring Power	St. Augustine	construction equipment		
Sally Corporation	Jacksonville	manufacturing		
Safariland	Jacksonville	manufacturing		
Seward Trunk Co.	Jacksonville	manufacturing		
Southeastern Grocers	Jacksonville	retail		
Stein Mart	Jacksonville	retail		OTCQX: SMRTQ
Stellar Group	Jacksonville	construction		
Swisher	Jacksonville	tobacco		
Trailer Bridge	Jacksonville	logistics		
Venus Swimwear	Jacksonville	apparel		
VyStar Credit Union	Jacksonville	financial services		
Web.com	St. Augustine	internet		
World Golf Village	St. Augustine	resort		
US Assure	Jacksonville	insurance		

=== Other locally based companies ===
- Advanced Bio Treatment
- Save Rite
- Stellar Group

== Nonprofit companies headquartered in the region ==
Name	City	Industry	Notes
Baptist Health	Jacksonville	healthcare	
Clara White Mission	Jacksonville	homelessness	
Edward Waters University	Jacksonville	education	
Flagler College	St. Augustine	education	
Florida State College at Jacksonville	Jacksonville	education	
HabiJax	Jacksonville	housing	
Hubbard House	Jacksonville	domestic abuse	
Jacksonville University	Jacksonville	education	
Jessie Ball duPont Fund	Jacksonville	charities	
Jones College	Jacksonville	education	
Lutheran Social Services Northeast Florida	Jacksonville	social services	
Nemours Foundation	Jacksonville	healthcare	
Second Harvest North Florida	Jacksonville	hunger	
St. Vincent's HealthCare	Jacksonville	healthcare	
Sulzbacher Center	Jacksonville	homelessness	
Tom Coughlin Jay Fund Foundation	Ponte Vedra Beach	childhood cancer	
UF Health at Jacksonville	Jacksonville	healthcare	
University of North Florida	Jacksonville	education	
Wounded Warrior Project	Jacksonville	veteran rehabilitation	
PURE - People for Urban and Rural Education	St.Johns	youth development, human services, education	

== US headquarters of foreign corporations ==
Name	City	Industry	Notes
Adecco Group North America	Jacksonville	Staffing/Recruiting	
Association of Tennis Professionals	Ponte Vedra Beach	sports (professional)	
Buffet Group USA	Jacksonville	musical instruments	
Höegh Autoliners	Jacksonville	shipping	
Survitec Group North America	Jacksonville	Marine Safety and Survivability	
Saft Batteries	Jacksonville	Battery manufacture	

== Divisions of US corporations ==
Name	City	Industry	Owner	Fortune 500 rank (2013)	Notes
Arthur Treacher's	Jacksonville	food	Trufoods		
BI-LO	Jacksonville	grocery	Southeastern Grocers		
Foundation Financial Group	Jacksonville	financial services			
Southeast Toyota Distributors	Jacksonville	automotive products	JM Family Enterprises		
Swisher International Group	Jacksonville	tobacco products			
Unison Industries	Jacksonville	aviation	General Electric	8	
Vistakon	Jacksonville	pharmaceuticals	Johnson & Johnson	41	
Winn-Dixie	Jacksonville	grocery	Southeastern Grocers		

== Defunct corporations ==
Name	City	Industry	Fate	Notes
Atlantic Coast Line Railroad	Jacksonville	transportation	merged	with the Seaboard Air Line Railroad, Ultimately became CSX Transportation
Atlantic Marine	Jacksonville	shipbuilding	acquired	by BAE Systems in May 2010
Barnett Bank	Jacksonville	financial	merged	with NationsBank, Ultimately became Bank of America
Bombardier Capital	Jacksonville	financial services	failed	Portfolio purchased by GE Commercial Finance
Charter Company	Jacksonville	conglomerate	assets sold	
EverBank	Jacksonville	financial services	acquired	by TIAA Bank
JanPak	Jacksonville	distributor	merged	with AmSan, CleanSource, Sexauer, Trayco, Ultimately became SupplyWorks
M. D. Moody & Sons, Inc.	Jacksonville	construction equipment	assets sold	Succeeded by MOBRO Marine, Inc. and Dell Marine
Norman Studios	Jacksonville	film	failed	
Offshore Power Systems	Jacksonville	utilities	failed	
RailAmerica	Jacksonville	transportation	acquired	by Fortress Investment Group in 2007
Stockton, Whatley, Davin & Co.	Jacksonville	financial services	acquired	by Phillips Petroleum Company

== Divisions of foreign corporations ==
- BAE Systems Southeast Shipyards - Jacksonville - div. of BAE Systems

== Corporations that moved to a different region ==
- St. Joe Company - moved to Watersound, Florida
- Burger King - moved to Miami, Florida

== Economic overview ==
Harbor improvements since the late 19th century have made Jacksonville a major military and civilian deep-water port. Its riverine location facilitates two U.S. Navy bases and the Port of Jacksonville, Florida's third largest seaport.

Interstate Highways 10 and 95 intersect in Jacksonville, creating the busiest intersection in the region with 200,000 vehicles each day. Interstate 10 ends at this intersection (the other end being in Santa Monica, California).

Three significant freight railroads call Jacksonville home, and there are four public airports available: Jacksonville International Airport, Jacksonville Executive at Craig Airport, Herlong Recreational Airport and Cecil Airport at Cecil Commerce Center.

To emphasize the city's transportation capabilities, the Jacksonville Regional Chamber of Commerce filed "Jacksonville America's Logistics Center" as a trademark on November 9, 2007. It was formally registered on August 4, 2009. Cornerstone began promoting the city as "Jacksonville: America's Logistics Center" in 2009. Signs were added to the existing city limit markers on Interstate 95.

Significant factors in the local economy include services such as banking, insurance, and healthcare.

As with much of Florida, tourism is also important to the Jacksonville area, particularly tourism related to golf.

=== Strong presence in Jacksonville ===
The following notable businesses and organizations can be found in the Jacksonville, Florida area. Companies in bold with an asterisk (*) indicates a major employer in excess of 2,000 employees:

- Amazon
- **Amtrak***
- Anheuser-Busch
- **AT&T***
- **Bank of America***
- **BJ's Wholesale Club***
- Buffet Crampon
- CB Richard Ellis
- CIT Group*
- **Citibank***
- **Convergys***
- **Deutsche Bank***
- Fleet Readiness Center Southeast (FRCSE)
- Gerdau Long Steel North America
- JM Family Enterprises Inc.
- **Mayo Clinic***
- Norfolk Southern Railway
- Northrop Grumman
- **Publix***
- Southeast Toyota Distributors
- **State of Florida***
- Swisher International Group
- **United Parcel Service***
- **United States Postal Service***
- **Wal-Mart***
- Webster University
- **Wells Fargo***
