= George Gadson =

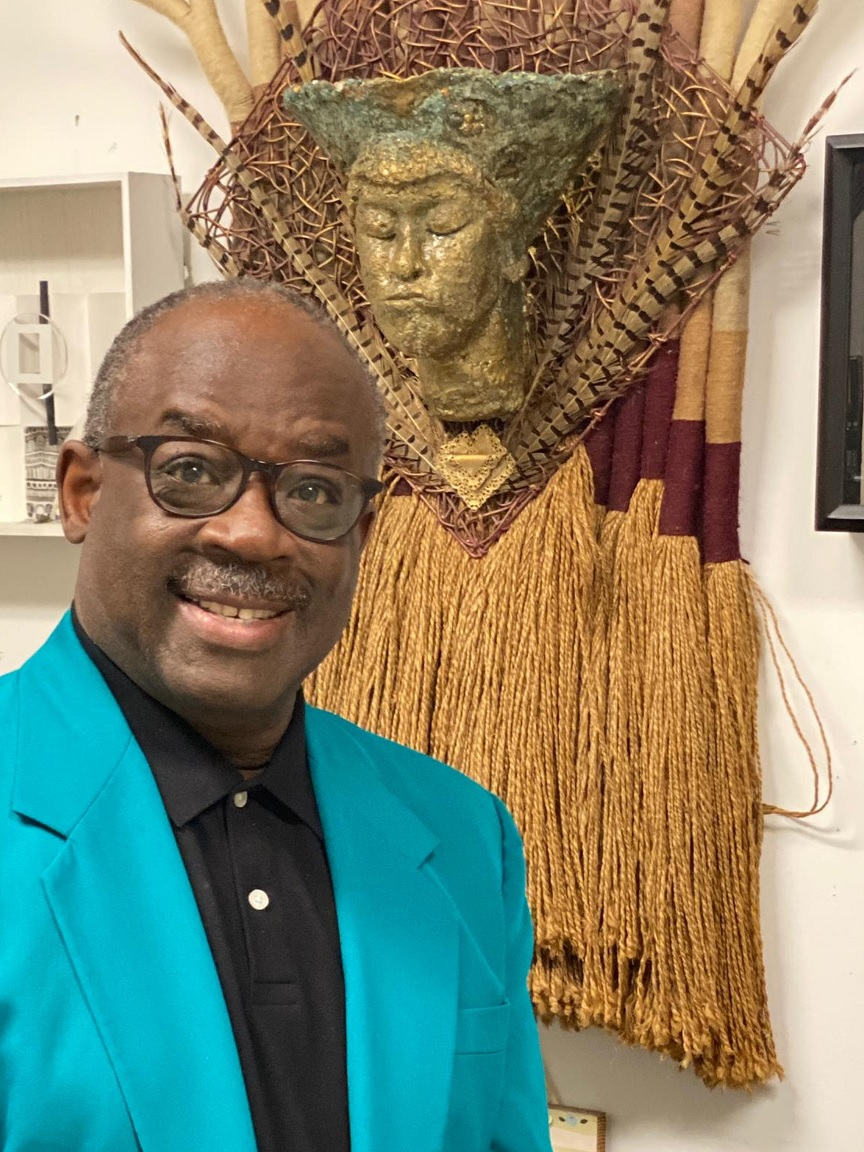
- Born: August 10, 1953 (age 73); Fort Meade, Florida
- Education: Duke University (B.A.); Brewer Christian College (M.E.)
- Occupations: Artist; sculptor; painter; photographer
- Known for: Sculpting; public art
- Notable work: The Kicker (1995); The Quarterback (1999)
- Website: www.georgegadsonstudios.com

George Gadson (born August 10, 1953) is an American artist, sculptor, painter, and photographer based in South Florida. His sculptures are displayed as public artwork in a variety of locations throughout Florida, including the African-American Research Library and Cultural Center in Fort Lauderdale, Florida Memorial University in Miami, and the Broward County School Board building. In the 1990s, he was commissioned to create two limited-edition sculptures (The Kicker and The Quarterback) for two Florida-based Super Bowls. He was also commissioned to design an ornament for the White House Christmas tree in 2008 and a sculpture for NFL linebacker Ray Lewis in 2018. He is the owner of George Gadson Studios through which he also provides public art consulting.

== Early life and education ==
George Gadson was raised in Fort Meade, Florida. During high school, he worked as a bank teller and was active in the Baptist church. He attended Duke University, graduating in 1975 with a BA in theology. He also spent time studying in Valencia, Spain, and eventually earned a master's degree in education at Brewer Christian College.

== Career ==
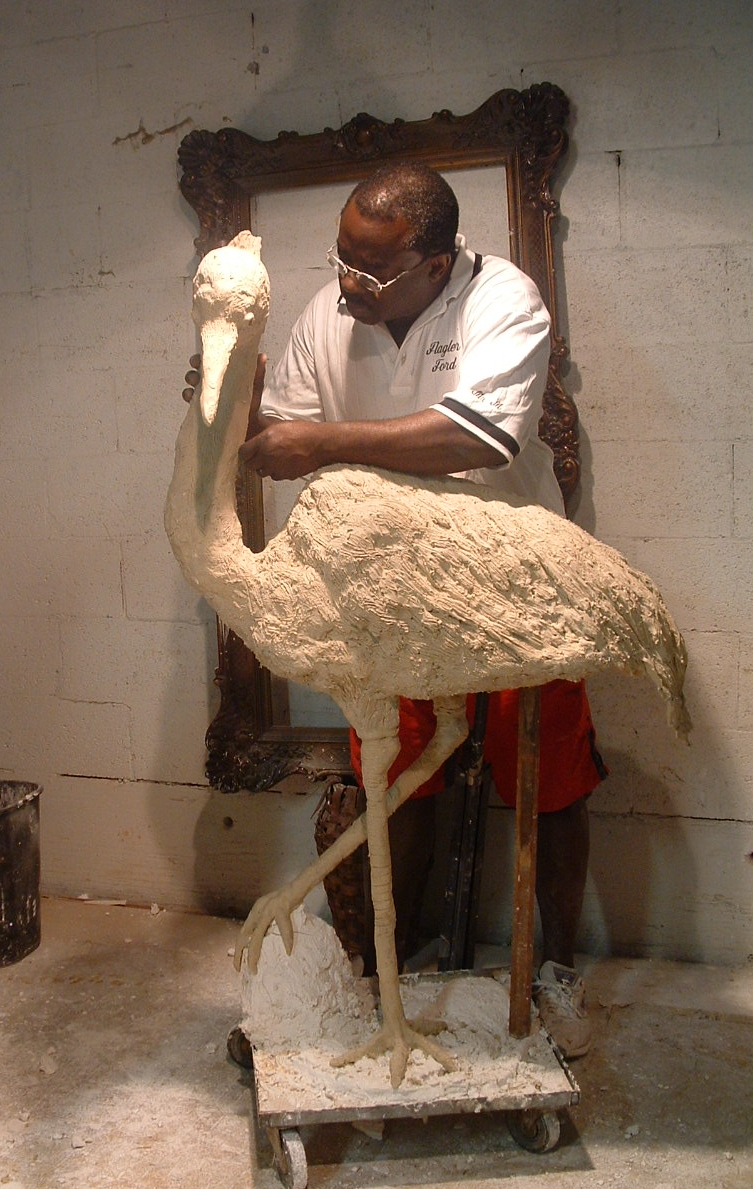
George Gadson working on Egret

After graduating from Duke University, Gadson went into the banking industry. In 1989, he opened his own mortgage brokerage firm in North Miami. In the early 1980s, he began attending an art class where he developed an interest in painting, sculpting, and photography. His paintings, which often depict portraits and representations of everyday life for African-Americans and Native Americans, began appearing in galleries and exhibitions in Tampa and Miami in the late 1980s and early 1990s. Also in the early 1990s, Gadson became an independent consultant, helping non-profit organizations secure loans and was later hired by the Greater Hollywood Chamber of Commerce as a small business development manager with a focus on minority-owned businesses.

In 1994, Gadson donated a portrait of Dan Marino to the NFL quarterback's Charity Classic golf event. The following year, he was commissioned to create a limited-edition, commemorative sculpture for NFL team owners. The bronze sculpture, known as The Kicker, was given to around 100 different team owners and other league officials to commemorate Super Bowl XXIX, which took place in Miami. Soon after, he began earning commissions for public and private art projects, including some for Jim Moran of JM Family Enterprises.

In 1996, paintings by Gadson was displayed at an exhibition at the museum of the Old Dillard High School, a former school for black students in Fort Lauderdale. In 1999, Gadson was commissioned to create a sculpture for that year's Super Bowl in Miami. He sculpted a bronze statue of a quarterback (called The Quarterback), which was gifted to team owners. In 2002, a Gadson sculpture of a drum called The Bridge was erected at the newly-opened African-American Research Library and Cultural Center in Fort Lauderdale. In 2003, Gadson created a bronze bust of civil rights activist, Spencer Pompey, which was put on display in Delray Beach City Hall. An exhibition of Gadson's work titled, Then & Now, was held in January 2004 at the Old Davie School Museum Gallery. The event featured Gadson's paintings, sculptures, and photographs. In March 2006, Gadson's Lift Ev'ry Voice, a bronze statue of an African-American woman, was unveiled at the Lou Rawls Center for the Performing Arts at Florida Memorial University. That year, he also created a sculpture commemorating the Tuskegee Airmen, a group of African-American military pilots who fought in World War II. In 2008, he created an ornament for the White House Christmas tree. By that time he had formed George Gadson Studios in Hollywood, Florida and was consulting on public art projects. In 2013, Gadson released the book Art Psalms, a collection of his artwork and poetry. By 2014, he had created additional public art pieces for the Urban League of Broward County (Equality) and the cities of Lauderdale Lakes, Pompano Beach, and Boynton Beach. He was also the chairman of the Tamarac Public Art Committee.

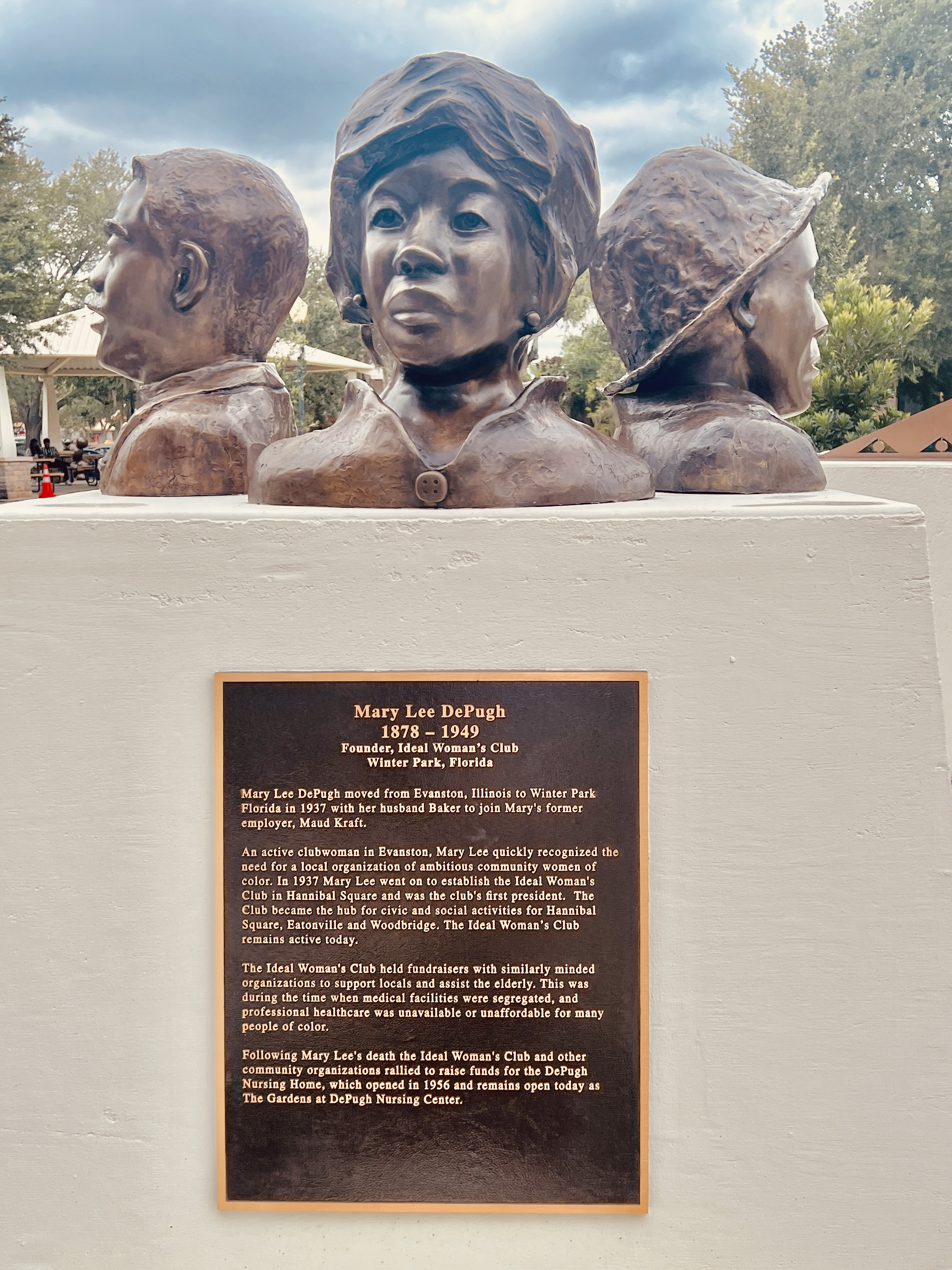
Museum without Walls – An Ancestral Tribute, July 2024 at Shady Park at Hannibal Square, Winter Park, Florida.

In 2014, he held an exhibition entitled, Naturally Morphic, at the Sunrise Civic Center Art Gallery. The exhibition featured pieces composed largely from found objects, natural materials, and photographs. In 2015, he was commissioned to create a sculpture of the Sankofa bird, a Ghanaian mythological figure, for Sistrunk Park in Fort Lauderdale. In 2018, Gadson was commissioned to sculpt a statue as a gift for former NFL linebacker, Ray Lewis, in Lewis' hometown of Lakeland, Florida.

In 2019, Gadson was invited to hold a solo exhibition (About Faces) at the Sunrise Civic Center Art Gallery, and in 2020, he took part in the collaborative exhibition, Roots of the Spirit: Soulful Expressions of the African Diaspora, held by the arts non-profit, ArtServe. In 2021, Gadson was commissioned to create a statue for a new YMCA building in Fort Lauderdale.

In 2023, Gadson created a sculpture entitled Sankofa, in honor of Patricia Hilliard-Nunn, an activist and African American studies professor. It was dedicated in Gainesville, Florida on Juneteenth in 2023 and replaced a Confederate monument removed from the same site in 2017. In August 2024, Gadson's Museum without Walls – An Ancestral Tribute was unveiled at Shady Park at Hannibal Square. The memorial included busts as centerpieces, a wall of notes with significant dates of this Square's history, and a shield with engraved ram horns with a separate elephant tusk sculpture.
