= Joseph Leone =

Italian-born American architect

- Born: Bologna, Italy
- Occupations: Designer; Entrepreneur; Developer
- Known for: Le Palais Royal, My Seanna
- Website: https://josephleone.onesothebysrealty.com/

Joseph Leone is a designer, entrepreneur and developer of Italian and French origin working in the United States. He is best known as the designer and developer of Le Palais Royal, a 60,000 square feet luxury mansion, which was the most expensive home in the United States when it was put on sale in 2014. Leone's other notable project was the rebuilding and expansion of the mega yacht My Seanna.

== Life and work ==
Leone was born in Bologna, Italy. When he was 7, his family moved to southern France, where he grew up watching his father create men's suits in his tailor shop. When Joseph Leone was 23 years old, he started his own high-fashion jewelry design and manufacturing company in Marseille, working with French haute couture and fashion houses such as Jean Patou, Rochas, Celine, Annick Gouta, and Lancel.

In 1991, Leone arrived in the USA (Miami), where he worked with department stores such as Saks Fifth Avenue and Bergdorf Goodman.

Leone decided to change careers in 2004, when a client invited him to become involved with the management of his private assets. His meeting with the multimillionaire Robert W. Pereira led to his two largest and most famous projects: the design and construction of Le Palais Royal, a 60,000 square foot mansion valued at $159 million, and the rebuilding and expansion of the mega yacht My Seanna.

=== Le Palais Royal ===
The client purchased an estate with a waterfront mansion in Hillsboro Beach in 2004. After buying an additional estate for a total of 5 acres, both houses were torn down. Leone began designing Le Palais Royal in 2007 and began building in 2009. He hired Coastal Construction Group to build the estate.

Le Palais Royal was inspired by the Palace of Versailles and Buckingham Palace. With construction costs exceeding $100 million, the 11-bedroom palace includes several unique luxury elements, such as the first ever home IMAX cinema in the world, a 29-foot tall waterfall, and over half a million leaves of 22 carat gold covering the gates and the interior. Leone said he wanted to "build a château in the US," designed to last like old European palaces.

In 2014, Leone's client decided to sell the house because of his frequent travelling. Internationally marketed as "The American Jewel," Le Palais Royal was the most expensive home in the United States when it was first put on sale. Its price as of mid-2016 was $159 million.

=== My Seanna ===
Impressed with the way Le Palais was moving along, the client decided to hire Leone to rebuild his 164-foot superyacht Newvida. The yacht was originally Gallant Lady, built by Delta for Jim Moran in 2001. The client purchased the yacht from JM Lexus in 2006.

Originally, the client wanted a new boat. However, as he loved his yacht, Leone convinced him to keep the Delta and undertake a significant refit. Over the course of a year, Leone invited brokers for sale and charter to come aboard the yacht, consider its strengths and weaknesses, and suggest changes or additions. The goal was to make it the best charter yacht on the market.

After meeting with naval architect Patrick Dupuis of Murray & Associates, Leone started the 18-month transformation project. The Rybovich Shipyard in Florida was tasked with the completion of the advanced cosmetic and structural changes to the vessel. Key to the rebuild was the extension: by adding 25 feet to the hull, she could then accommodate one of the most requested features from charter brokers: a beach club. It also allowed the upper deck to be extended so that it could include a touch-and-go helipad. A cutting edge AV system was installed, featuring an outdoor film screen on the sun deck and an underwater camera whose picture can be seen on the TV. Other changes included two jet skis, a center island in the midships area, an oversized custom pool, an exercise area and a sauna Leone designed the yacht's interior decor for a Continental feel, with extensive use of 24-carat gold leaf and Italian marble. He described it as being "like a Ritz Carlton, a very beautiful hotel, but the views change."

Completed in November 2014, it was a $17-million "total, no-holds-barred, you-have-to-see-it-to-believe-it rebuild." The yacht was "thoroughly and completely redesigned from the keel up to be a pure charter machine." The boat, now 185 foot long, was rechristened My Seanna after the owner's daughter. It became one of the most successful charters in the market.

My Seanna was a finalist at the 2015 World Superyacht Awards in Amsterdam.
