= Toyota Motor Sales, USA =

American car distributor

Coordinates: 33.857163°N 118.3118381°W

Toyota Motor Sales, USA, Inc.
- Logo since 2019

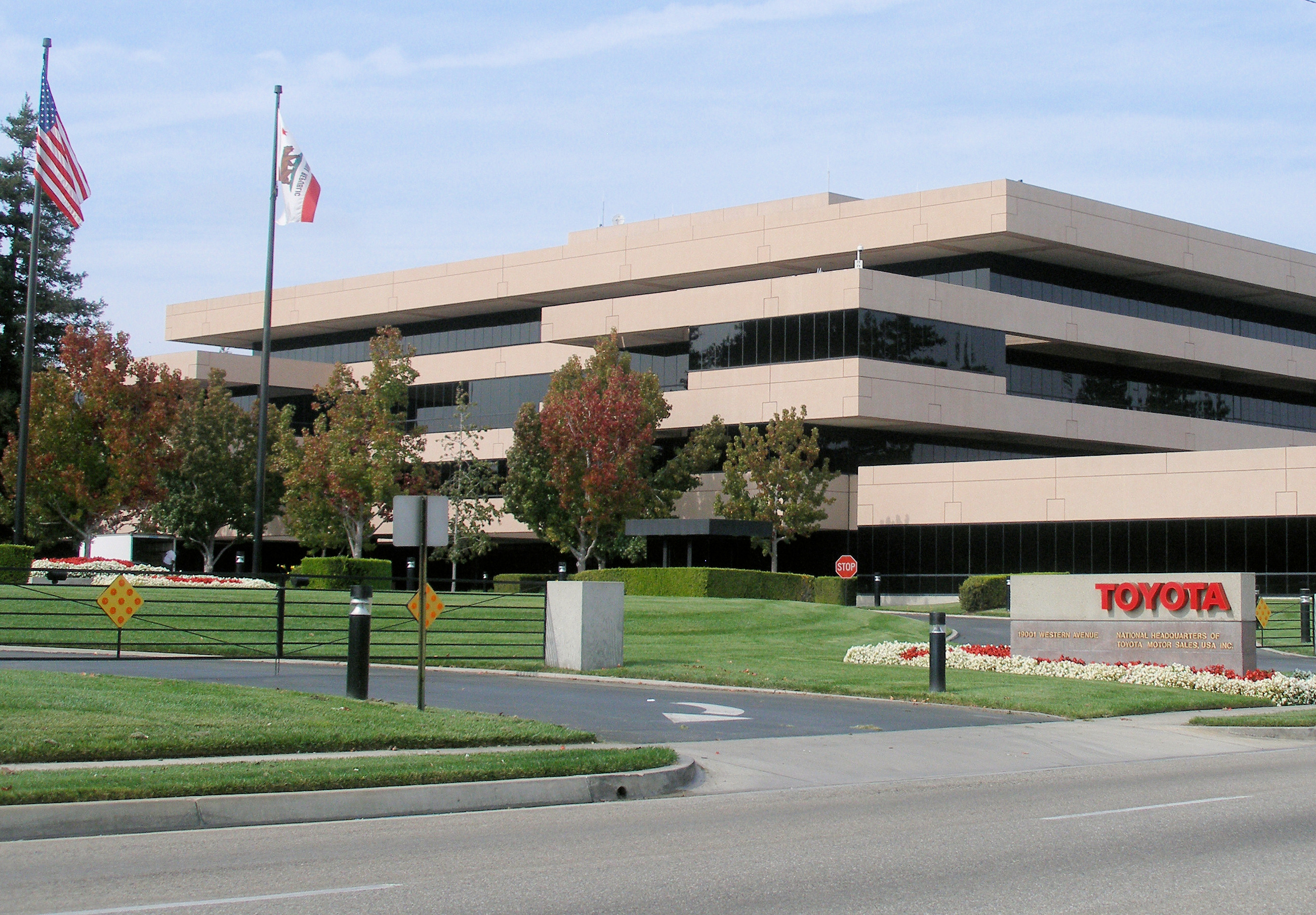
- Former headquarters in Torrance, California
- Founded: October 31, 1957; 68 years ago Los Angeles, California, U.S.
- Headquarters: Plano, Texas, U.S.
- Key people: Tetsuo Ogawa, CEO
- Products: Toyota and Lexus products sold in the United States market
- Owner: Toyota Motor Corporation
- Number of employees: 6,500 (2014)
- Parent: Toyota Motor North America
- Website: Toyota.com

Toyota Motor Sales, USA, Inc. (TMS, also known as Toyota USA) is the North American Toyota sales, marketing, and distribution subsidiary devoted to the United States market. Founded in 1957 in California, TMS currently employs more than 6,500 people. As of spring 2017 Toyota moved to a new campus in Plano, Texas. Construction of this new facility began in the fall of 2014, and is located at the corner of Texas State Highway 121 and Legacy Drive, across the street from the FedEx Office Headquarters, and the J. C. Penney World Headquarters. The former location of Toyota's headquarters was Torrance, California, where they supervised 14 regional offices. TMS oversees the sales of Toyota and Lexus products in 49 states through a network of over 1,200 Toyota dealers (of whom more than 900 also previously sold Scion vehicles) and over 200 Lexus dealers. California has the greatest number of Toyota dealerships of any other state at 172 dealerships. Toyota vehicles in Hawaii are distributed by Servco Pacific. TMS develops Toyota's television campaigns and other nationwide marketing materials, and supervises dealer marketing to ensure that dealers present a uniform image. TMS also manages regional distribution, which occurs through 12 parts centers and five vehicle centers. James E. Lentz III is the president of TMS.

== Corporate affairs ==
=== Corporate headquarters ===
==== Plano headquarters move ====
In 2014 Toyota announced it was moving its United States headquarters to Plano, Texas in the Dallas-Fort Worth area. The new headquarters will have around 4,000 total employees, including about 2,000 employees from the current headquarters and 1,000 employees from Toyota Financial Services, which also was in Torrance. The company plans to permanently move most employees by the time of completion of the new headquarters, late 2016 or early 2017, while initially the company will open a temporary office in Texas and move small groups of employees there in the interim. The administration of the Dallas Japanese School, the supplementary Japanese school serving Japanese citizen and Japanese American children living in the DFW area, stated that it expected to receive an additional 150 students due to the headquarters move.

On Tuesday April 29, 2014, Mayor of Dallas Mike Rawlings stated that Toyota had considered moving the US offices to the City of Dallas but decided against it due to the quality of the Dallas Independent School District (DISD). A spokesperson of Toyota stated that the company, when deciding where to relocate, considered higher education, K-12 schools, access to the airport, and cost of living. The spokesperson did not say which cities other than Plano were being considered. In response to the move, the mayor of Torrance, Frank Scotto, stated that he was "very disappointed" by the decision.

Matthew Haag of The Dallas Morning News stated that Toyota may have moved its headquarters to suburban Plano because of its similarities to Torrance, another suburban city.

==== Former headquarters ====
The company formerly maintained its headquarters in Torrance, California in Greater Los Angeles. The campus has six buildings, with a total of 2,000,000 square feet (190,000 m^{2}) of office space. In 2012 a 1.1 megawatt hydrogen fuel cell generator was installed at the campus, giving half of the power for the six buildings during the peak demand period. The generator does not generate emissions. By using the generator, as of 2012 the company saves $130,000 in utility bill charges. As of 2014 the headquarters has 5,300 employees.

On October 31, 1957, Toyota opened its first United States office in a former Rambler/Ford dealership, at 6000 Hollywood Blvd. As of July 2022 that building is still a Toyota dealership. Because the city had airline access to Tokyo and because of the proximity to the Port of Los Angeles the US division of Toyota located its headquarters in the Los Angeles area.

The Torrance headquarters opened in 1982. In 2003 the Toyota South Campus in Torrance received the Golden Nugget Award. After Toyota's departure the Torrance headquarters has been sold for redevelopment and by 2022 the campus has been demolished.

== Products ==
=== Current Toyota products ===
==== Passenger cars ====
- Corolla (gasoline and hybrid)
- Camry (hybrid)
- Crown (hybrid)
- Mirai (fuel cell vehicle)
- Prius (hybrid)
- Prius Prime (hybrid)

==== Sports Cars ====
- GR86
- GR Corolla
- GR Supra

==== Crossovers, SUVs and minivans ====
- 4Runner
- bZ
- bZ Woodland
- C-HR
- Corolla Cross
- Crown Signia
- Grand Highlander
- Highlander
- Land Cruiser
- RAV4
- Sequoia
- Sienna

==== Pickup trucks ====
- Tacoma
- Tundra

=== Current Lexus products ===
==== Passenger cars ====
- ES (hybrid)
- IS
- LS (gasoline and hybrid)

==== Coupes ====
- LC (gasoline and hybrid)
- RC
- RC F

==== Crossovers and SUVs ====
- GX
- LX
- NX
- RX
- RZ
- TX
- UX

== Distribution ==
In early 1968, Jim Moran was contacted by a friend from Chicago who said that Toyota wanted to establish a dealer network in the Southeast U.S. and wanted to talk to him. Moran asked what a Toyota was. The company had been unsuccessful at breaking into the American market at the end of the 1950s and was trying again. Moran declined, but his friend was insistent that Moran drive one. According to Moran, he tested everything to see if it would break. While cruising at 55 mph on the interstate, Moran shifted into reverse, and the engine and transmission survived. Moran concluded that although Toyotas weren't as stylish or comfortable as domestic vehicles, they were well-built, reasonably priced, and destined to change the automotive business. On October 26, 1968, he entered into an agreement to distribute Toyota vehicles from the Port of Jacksonville and Southeast Toyota Distributors (SET) was founded that year.

There was a similar story for Thomas H. Friedkin. During the 1960s, one of Friedkin's hobbies was racing cars. He was friends with Carroll Shelby, famous for designing the AC Cobra and the Shelby Mustang. Shelby had turned down an offer to become a distributor for Toyota because Lee Iacocca told Shelby that "the domestic makers were going to push the Japanese back into the ocean". Shelby introduced Friedkin to Toyota, and Friedkin entered into an agreement to distribute Toyota vehicles from the Port of Houston. Gulf States Toyota Distributors (GST) was founded in 1969.

Toyota Dealers in the remaining 40 states receive their vehicles from Toyota Motor Sales.

=== Southeast Toyota Distributors ===
Southeast Toyota Distributors, a subsidiary of JM Family Enterprises, is the world's largest independent distributor of Toyota vehicles in the United States. With 177 independent Toyota dealers in the five-state region of Alabama, Florida, Georgia, and North and South Carolina, Southeast Toyota sells 24% of Toyota sales in the U.S.

=== Gulf States Toyota Distributors ===
Gulf States Toyota Distributors, a subsidiary of Friedkin Group, is the other independent distributor of Toyota vehicles in the United States. Their 158 independent Toyota dealers sell vehicles in the five states of Arkansas, Louisiana, Mississippi, Oklahoma, and Texas.

== Marketing ==
Toyota Motor Sales USA purchased the naming rights to the Toyota Center in Houston, Texas in 2003. The 20-year deal was worth $95 million; $4.75 million per year. It was the 10th most expensive naming deal for an NBA facility. The arena is home to the Houston Rockets of the National Basketball Association and was the first time a sports facility in Houston was sponsored by an international company.

== See also ==
- Toyota Motor North America
- Gulf States Toyota Distributors
- Southeast Toyota Distributors
- Toyota USA Automobile Museum
- History of the Japanese in Los Angeles
