= Gadson =

Gadson is an English surname. Notable people with the surname include:

- George Gadson (born 1953), American artist
- Gregory D. Gadson (born 1966), American actor, motivational speaker, and army officer
- James Gadson (1939–2026), American drummer and session musician
- Jeannette Gadson (1945–2007), New York politician
