= Ralph Leon Bagley =

American artist

Ralph Bagley
- Born: Ralph Leon Bagley; 1913; Bertrand, Missouri
- Died: January 8, 2008 (aged 94); Winter Park, Florida
- Education: Flint Institute of Arts, Art Students League of New York, Corcoran Gallery School
- Known for: Oil Painting, Charcoal

Ralph Leon Bagley (1913 – January 8, 2008) was a Central Florida artist and art instructor who specialized in charcoal and oil.

== Early life and education ==
Ralph Leon Bagley was born in Bertrand, Missouri in 1913. While he was still a boy, the family moved to Flint, Michigan, where Bagley attended the Flint Institute of Arts while still in high school. In 1936, he married Marianne Avery, whom he met in St. Petersburg, Florida. For several years, the Bagleys divided their time between Daytona Beach, Florida, where they had an art store, Lake Winnipesaukee, New Hampshire, and Port Chester, New York. During their time in New York, Bagley studied at the Art Students’ League in New York City. During World War II the family moved to Washington, D.C., where he studied art at the Corcoran Gallery School.

== Artistic career ==
Beginning in 1946, Bagley was Staff Artist at Fontana Village Resort in the Smoky Mountains in North Carolina. The family moved to Florida in 1950, but even after settling in Orlando, the family enjoyed going back to Fontana Village for summer school for several years. Bagley opened the Orlando Institute of Art in 1955, which was the first school of fine art in Orlando. During that time he also taught art classes at Orlando Junior College, and in 1965 was made head of the Art Department. After the school closed in 1971, he taught at Lake Sumter Community College, Crealdé School of Art, Maitland Art Center, Valencia Community College, and Loch Haven Art Center (now the Orlando Museum of Art). Bagley served in many art organizations, was president of the Orlando Art Association, and a founding member and past president of the Artists’ League of Orange County. He toured the nation with at least 30 one-man art shows featuring his paintings. At all of the locations he lived or visited, he was always drawing sketches of the local scenery and giving workshops to demonstrate his charcoal technique.

== Later life and legacy ==
Bagley was a versatile artist who used oil, watercolor, and charcoal to depict landscapes, still lifes, and portraits. He loved experimentation and exploration to find satisfactory means of expressing personal ideas and feelings. That adventurous spirit led him to work with a great variety of media, although he devoted most of his time to charcoal and oil. Bagley was a creative mind who shared his love of art with everyone he came in contact with, and set an atmosphere for his students to learn and be creative. His wardrobe was always a shirt and tie, and defied the stereotypical dress of an artist. He taught art for nearly 60 years to college students and professionals alike. Bagley died at the age of 94 in Winter Park, Florida from a blood clot resulting from a fall that broke his hip on Christmas night.

== Exhibitions ==
- Orange County Regional History Center - Art Legends (March 5–29, 2016)
