= Robert C. Broward =

American architect

Robert C. Broward (March 30, 1926 – June 28, 2015) was an architect and author based in Jacksonville, Florida. He had a 61-year professional career during which he designed more than 500 projects. He was an adjunct Professor of Design at the University of Florida for more than four decades. He is known for his water effects including spilling effects with a decorative and sonic element, taking advantage of Florida's frequent rainstorms. His designs often included the work of local painters, sculptors and mixed-media artists. His works included small houses and chapels, large warehouses and office buildings, churches, art museums, movie theatres and large high-rises.

Broward attended Landon High School in Jacksonville. After graduating in 1944, he served in the United States Army Air Corps, then studied architecture at Georgia Tech. He studied with Frank Lloyd Wright at both Taliesin and Taliesin West.

Jim Moran commissioned Broward to create the Deerfield Beach corporate campus for JM Family Enterprises in 1981. Broward incorporated an oriental flair in the building's architecture in recognition of the Japanese company that manufactured Toyotas.

Among Broward's writings is a book about Henry John Klutho and The Prairie School in Jacksonville. In 2011 he was selected as a Fellow of the American Institute of Architects. An issue of a national architectural journal, Friends of Kebyar, was devoted to his work, and he was inducted into the Florida Artists Hall of Fame in 2012.

Broward died on June 28, 2015, following a stroke. He was 89 years old.

== Projects ==
- Sharecroppers' chapel in West Georgia (completed at the age of 23)
- Oceanfront residences and corporate headquarters for Southeast Toyota
- Unitarian Universalist Church of Jacksonville (1965), named by Broward as his favorite of his Jacksonville buildings

== See also ==
- Architecture of Jacksonville
