= Stellar Group =

Stellar Group or stellar group may refer to:

Companies

- Stellar Group (construction company), of Jacksonville, Florida
- a sports management company co-founded by Jonathan Barnett

Astronomy

- a grouping of stars
  - moving group or stellar group, a group of co-moving stars
    - stellar association
  - star cluster, a group of gravitationally bound stars
    - open cluster
      - galactic cluster
    - globular cluster
      - super star cluster
  - star cloud, a visually defined patch of stars
  - asterism (astronomy), a group of stars forming a pattern
    - traditional constellation
  - multiple star, a set of stars forming a close visual grouping
    - star system, a gravitationally bound system of stars
