= Southeast Toyota Distributors =

American vehicle distributor

Southeast Toyota Distributors LLC
- Type: Privately held company
- Industry: Automotive Distribution
- Founded: October 26, 1968; 57 years ago
- Founder: Jim Moran
- Headquarters: Deerfield Beach, Florida, USA; Jacksonville, Florida, USA (Operations)
- Key people: Brent Sergot (S.E.T. President & JM Family Exec VP)
- Products: Vehicles, Parts, Automotive Transport, Technical training
- Revenue: $437 million (2020, parts) (vehicle $ not released)
- Number of employees: 1,000 (2020)
- Parent: JM Family Enterprises
- Website: Southeast Toyota Distributors

Southeast Toyota Distributors LLC, (SET) founded in 1968, is the top private distributor of Toyota vehicles in the world. It is franchised by Toyota Motor Sales, USA to sell vehicles and parts to car dealerships in the five states of Alabama, Florida, Georgia, South Carolina and North Carolina. SET is a wholly owned subsidiary of JM Family Enterprises. Corporate headquarters of both are located at Deerfield Beach, Florida. Primary operations are located in Jacksonville, Florida.

== History ==
In early 1968, Jim Moran was contacted by a friend from Chicago who said that Toyota wanted to establish a dealer network in the Southeastern United States and wanted to talk to him. Moran asked what a Toyota was. The company had been unsuccessful at breaking into the American market at the end of the 1950s and was trying again. Moran declined, but his friend was insistent that Moran drive one. According to Moran, he tested everything to see if it would break. While cruising at 55 mph on the interstate, Moran shifted into reverse, and the engine and transmission survived. Moran concluded that although Toyotas weren't as stylish or comfortable as domestic vehicles, they were well-built, reasonably priced, and destined to change the automotive business. On October 26, 1968, he entered into an agreement to distribute Toyota vehicles from the Port of Jacksonville and Southeast Toyota Distributors (SET) was founded that year. The first year, cars were sold to 42 dealerships by eleven associates in Pompano Beach, Florida. SET sold their one millionth Toyota in 1982. At that time, there were 151 dealerships.

When Toyota introduced the Lexus brand to the U.S. in 1989, SET began distributing them to their dealers in the Southeast. SET also began distributing the Scion brand in 2003.

The 2008 financial crisis followed by the 2009–2011 Toyota vehicle recalls forced SET to offer severance packages to 79 associates in vehicle processing and parts in Jacksonville and 31 in Commerce, Georgia.

== Operations ==
Southeast Toyota Distributors is the larger of the two private distributors of Toyota vehicles in the United States. The other is Gulf States Toyota in Houston, founded by the late Thomas H. Friedkin. Dealerships in the remaining areas of the United States are supplied by Toyota Motor Sales, USA.

Toyota Motor Sales opened seven manufacturing facilities in the US since 1984 and today, the majority of vehicles distributed by SET arrive by Rail transport, not ship.

In 2020, SET sold 434,033 vehicles, including 94,507 from fleet business.

=== Leadership ===
On January 4, 2022, Brent Sergot was named president of Southeast Toyota Distributors, LLC, and executive vice president of parent company JM Family Enterprises, Inc. Sergot is responsible for directing the overall operation of Southeast Toyota, including three vehicle processing facilities, parts supply and distribution, and Southeast Transportation Systems, Inc., the company's automotive transport division. He also serves as a member of JM Family's Executive Management Team, which oversees the development and implementation of the company's long-range planning and strategies for future growth. He replaced Ed Sheehy who served in those positions from July, 2008. Ken Czubay preceded Sheehy from 1990.

=== Vehicle processing ===
SET has three vehicle processing facilities. At each site, vehicles are prepared for sale, equipped with port-installed accessories, assigned to dealerships and loaded onto Car carrier trailers for transport to the dealerships. Port-installed accessories add to the sale price of the vehicle. Some examples include running boards, floor mats, spoilers, roof racks, alloy wheels, and caliper covers.

==== Ship facility ====
The ship facility is SETs original vehicle center located on 75-acres at the Jacksonville Port Authority (JaxPort) Talleyrand terminal and has processed vehicles that arrive by ship since 1968. 25 to 40% of Toyotas sold in the United States come from Japan, Turkey & France, and are processed by SET at the facility.

==== Blount Island ====
On April 25, 2022, Jaxport and SET jointly announced plans for SET to lease a new vehicle processing facility at nearby Blount Island. The new site will allow SET to redesign their operation for efficiency and increased capacity. Associate amenities available at other Jacksonville SET facilities will be added at the new location, expected to be completed by the end of 2024. Jaxport is currently working with the Florida Department of Transportation on a $45 million project to expand capacities at Blount Island. SET will contribute $16.5 million of that cost. The facility will then accommodate larger ships and permit two ships to berth simultaneously. The new site will have two vehicle processing buildings with a combined 250,000-square-foot (23,000 m^{2}) versus 200,000-square-foot (19,000 m^{2}); 88 acres (36 ha) versus 73 acres (30 ha) (non-contiguous) plus new CSX rail connections.

Following three years of construction, SET celebrated the completion of their $145 million Blount Island vehicle processing center in early February 2026 and began the move from Tallyrand. Improvements include a fuel island, charging stations for electric vehicles, a multi-lane car wash and vehicle loading onto railcars. Capacity is increased to 4,000 vehicles weekly.

==== Westlake Processing ====
In 2002, Southeast Toyota opened a $53 million vehicle processing facility on 250-acres in the Westlake Industrial Park of northwest Jacksonville near Interstate 295. Another parcel of 250-acres was acquired in 2005 for future use. There were 11 buildings encompassing 350,000-square-foot (33,000 m^{2}) on 100-acres of paved parking and a 50-car rail head on Pritchard Road. A 20,000-square-foot (1,900 m^{2}) central services building was constructed in 2015. The 2005 reserve parcel was sold in 2020 for a $7 million profit.

==== Inland Processing ====
SET's original Inland Processing facility at Commerce, Georgia was built in 1988 and staffed by 40 associates. The all-rail location handles vehicles intended for distribution to dealers in Northern Alabama, Northern Georgia and the Carolinas. By 2017, increased vehicle volume required 200 workers. SET broke ground for their new complex on December 11, 2018, across Georgia State Route 334 from their existing center. The new 350,000-square-foot (33,000 m^{2}) facility includes a fitness center, expanded café, health center, meeting rooms and a nature trail. It was completed in April 2020 at a cost of $100 million. The 300-acre complex includes six buildings, 50 acres of pavement and six industrial spurs and sidings to offload vehicles from 60 Rail cars simultaneously.

=== Parts ===
Southeast Toyota Parts operates from a single, 410,000-square-foot (38,000 m^{2}) warehouse in Jacksonville. When Lexus automobiles were introduced in 1989, SET Parts became the distributor of Lexus parts. As volume of both Toyota and Lexus products increased, the decision was made in 2012 for Lexus to diverge from the Jacksonville operation with half going to Atlanta and the remainder going to Orlando. In 2015, the total sales of Toyota and Lexus parts and accessories totalled $574 million. The Atlanta split occurred in July 2016 and the Orlando center opened in late 2016. In 2020, $437 million of Toyota parts & accessories were sold.

=== Transport ===
From SETs inception, the company used contract haulers to deliver vehicles to dealerships. That changed in July 2000 with the formation of Southeast Transportation Systems (STS). A 21,500-square-foot (2,000 m^{2}) facility was built at the SET Westlake Processing site in 2008. The center includes offices, service bays, truck wash, fuel pumps and a drivers lounge.

As of 2023, the subsidiary employs 102 drivers who logged 10,650,000 miles. That same year, STS transported almost 160,000 vehicles to 177 Southeast Toyota dealers and fleet customers from SET's Jacksonville and Commerce vehicle processing facilities.

=== Training ===
SET's Technical Training Center (TTC) opened in 2007 at the Westlake Processing center in Jacksonville. The 33,000 sq ft (3,100 m^{2}), $6.6 million facility offers courses that range from entry-level to advanced vehicle maintenance and repair education for Toyota vehicles using computerized diagnostic equipment and hybrid technology. The TTC can provide 83,000 training hours each year.

At the same facility, SET's Technical Services department assists dealership technicians with diagnostic problems.
