= The Home Depot Pro =

U.S. wholesale distributor

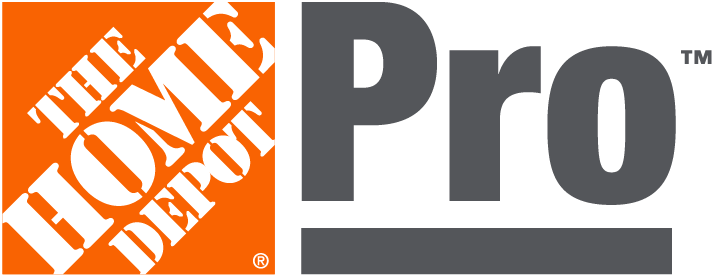
- Formerly: Interline Brands
- Type: Subsidiary
- Industry: Wholesale; Distribution; Retail
- Founded: Wilmar Industries; 1978; 48 years ago Interline Brands, Inc. 2000; 26 years ago The Home Depot Pro; 2018; 8 years ago
- Headquarters: Jacksonville, Florida, U.S.
- Area served: United States; Canada; Mexico
- Products: Plumbing, electrical, security hardware, HVAC, janitorial & sanitary products
- Number of employees: 4,300
- Parent: The Home Depot
- Subsidiaries: The Home Depot Multifamily; The Home Depot Pro Specialty Trades; The Home Depot Pro Institutional; U.S. Lock
- Website: homedepotpro.com

The Home Depot Pro, headquartered in Jacksonville, Florida, is a wholesale distributor and direct marketer of maintenance, repair and operations (MRO) products for non-industrial businesses in the United States. The Home Depot Pro distributes products such as HVAC, janitorial supplies, plumbing supplies, and security supplies.

The Home Depot Pro was established in 1978 formerly known as Wilmar Industries, founded by William S. Green. In 2000, Wilmar acquired Barnett together forming the company Interline Brands. Gradually, Interline Brands diversified their customer base through the acquisitions of Sexauer, Trayco, Barnett, U.S. Lock, Leran Gas Products, Maintenance USA, Hardware Express, and janitorial supply distributors AmSan, Clean Source and Jan Pak. In 2015, Interline Brands merged five of its janitorial brands into one unified brand called Supply Works. On July 22, 2015, The Home Depot acquired Interline Brands for $1.6 billion. Interline Brands was rebranded in 2018 as The Home Depot Pro. The former brand names of Interline Brands were renamed to The Home Depot Pro Multifamily, The Home Depot Pro Speciality Trades, and The Home Depot Pro Institutional.

== History ==
=== Wilmar Industries ===
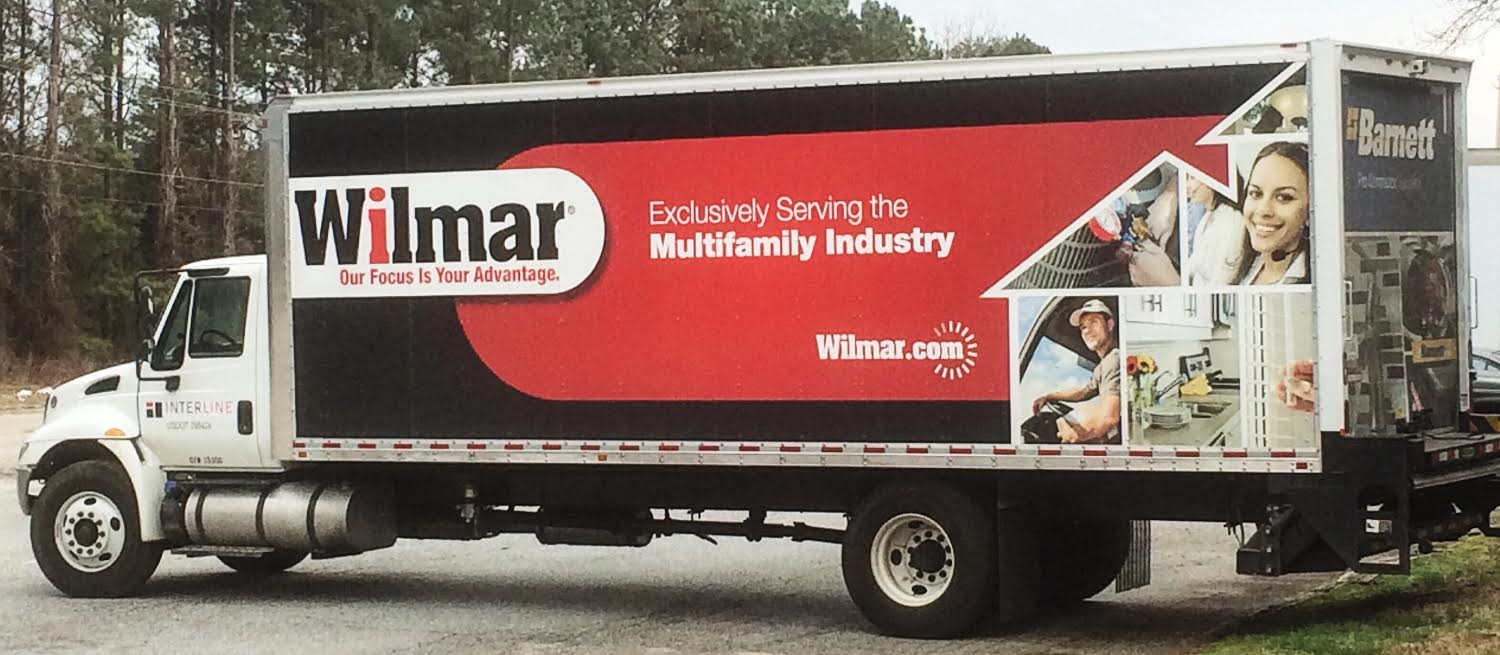
Wilmar delivery truck

The origin of Interline Brands first began with Wilmar Supply Company in 1978. Wilmar was a hardware store in Collingswood, New Jersey founded by William (Bill) Green and his father Martin Green. To expand its business beyond retail it began selling MRO products to area apartment complexes and then expanded geographically by distributing to multi-family housing businesses. Wilmar went public in 1996 and purchased 14 regional competing businesses before acquiring the Sexauer Group, an established distributor of plumbing products to institutions, in 1999. A leveraged buyout in May 2000 took the company private in preparation for the next stage of growth. Wilmar acquired Barnett, Inc. because the two businesses were very similar, but each targeted a different customer base. Wilmar's customers were people who did facility maintenance work, while Barnett sold to locksmiths, retail hardware, and contractors.

Wilmar Industries acquired Barnett in September 2000 and renamed the umbrella company Interline Brands in June 2001. Their guiding principle was to "change as little as possible about the way our customers currently do business with us".

Each of the businesses (including Sexauer) retained their identity from the customer's point of view, including salesmen, telephone numbers, products, etc. They realized the value of each company's brand, and preserved sales/marketing relationships built over the years. What did change was behind the scenes in accounting, distribution, and administration, realizing economies of scale. In 2000, Interline had a total of 76 distribution centers, which they were able to shrink to 56 in 2004. A 319,000 sq ft (29,600 m2) national distribution center in Nashville, Tennessee was opened in 2001, reducing the inventory required at the local distribution centers and improving delivery times. In late 2004 Interline went public as NYSE: IBI but was later delisted in September 2012 to become privatized.

=== Acquisitions and rebranding ===
To further expand the business of Interline the firm acquired several distributors of cleaning supplies. It first acquired American Sanitary or AmSan in May 2006 for $127.5 million along with AmSan's own line of products called Renown. Renown has base products such as toilet paper, paper towels, brooms, and cleaning agents. In the 1990s AmSan became a conglomerate by buying 44 independent janitor and sanitary distributors. Some of AmSan's acquisitions are AmSan Eve, AmSan Vonachen-Elton, AmSan Nogg Chemical & Paper, and AmSan West. In 2002 Michael Mulhern became CEO of AmSan. Mulhern moved the headquarters of AmSan from Raleigh, North Carolina to Chicago, Illinois. Under Mulhern AmSan underwent a series of reforms dedicated to increasing profitability. AmSan turned over 40% of its top 35 executives, downsized its office operations, and downsized under-performing distribution centers. By 2005 AmSan had revenues totaling $300 million. American Capital invested $25 million in the recapitalization of AmSan in 2005. AmSan West, which has operations in Sacramento and Los Angeles, was not acquired by Interline Brands. In 2008 AmSan established a sales and distribution territory in Columbus, Cleveland, Pittsburgh, Atlanta and Nashville. In 2009 a showroom and walk-in store was established in Fort Myers, Florida.

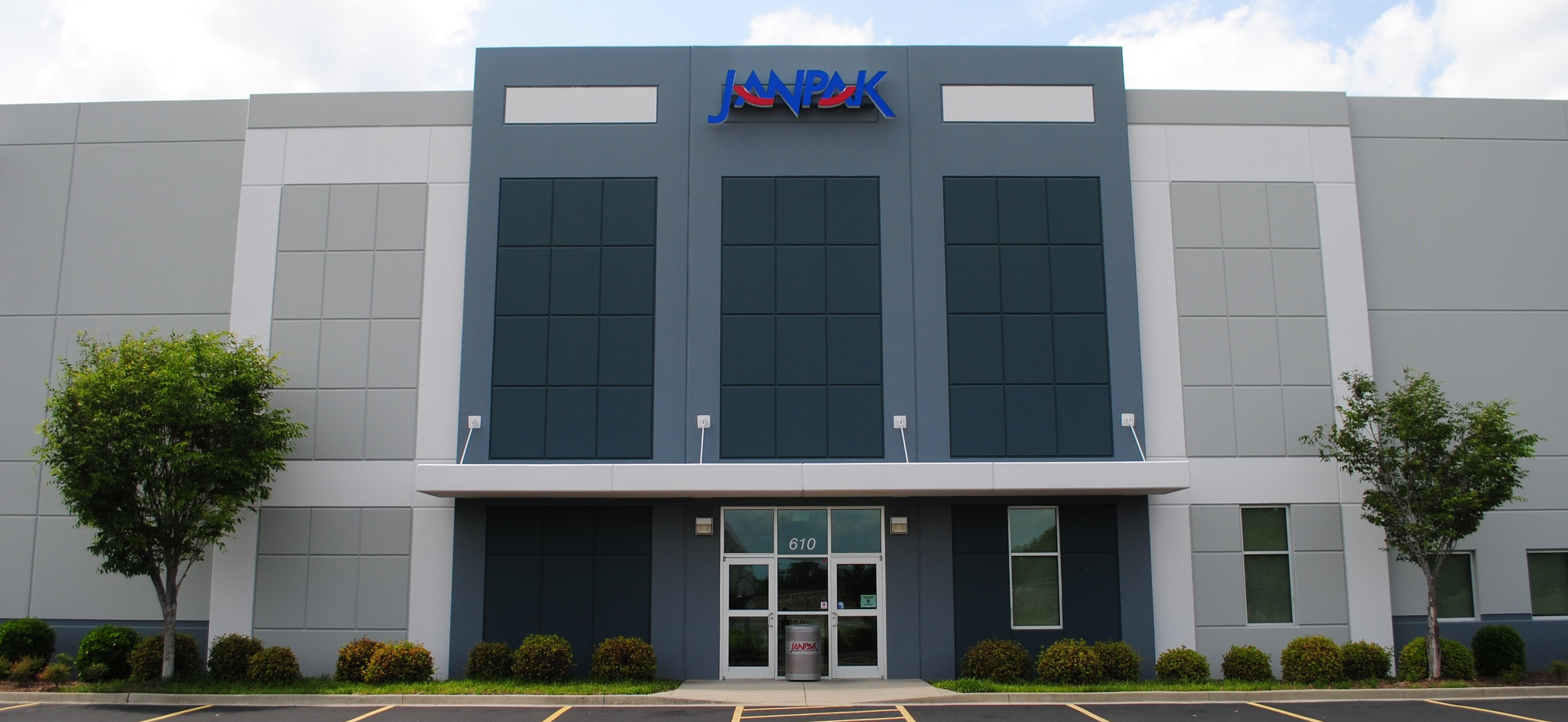
JanPak in West Columbia, South Carolina

Cleansource, a regional distributor of JanSan products, was acquired in October 2010 for $60.1 million. CleanSource was founded in 1956 in San Jose, California. It distributes janitorial, food service supplies, and MRO products. Customers of CleanSource consist of healthcare, education, and institutional facilities. In 2010 CleanSource generated around $115 million in sales.

A regional supplier of cleaning and packaging solutions called JanPak was acquired in 2012 for $82 million. JanPak was founded in 1945 in Bluefield, West Virginia by James Shott, H. I. Shott, Jr., James Tilson, L. M. Kerley Sr. and B. L. Early. It was first called Paper Supply Company until 2000 when the name changed to JanPak Inc. Mike Shott, James Shott's grandson, was serving as company chair of the board directors at the time of the name change to JanPak. The name changed to JanPak to unite its sister branches such as Charlotte Paper Company or Greenville Paper Company who each were known by a different name.

On March 16, 2015, Interline merged AmSan, CleanSource, JanPak, Trayco, and Sexauer into a new national brand called SupplyWorks. AF Lighting was also sold to Almo Corporation in March 2015 because lighting was a minimal part of the business of Interline Brands.

=== Purchase by The Home Depot and rebranding ===
The Home Depot acquired Interline Brands in July 2015 for $1.6 billion from P2 Capital Partners, Goldman Sachs' private equity arm, and the management of Interline Brands. The acquisition of Interline Brands allows The Home Depot access to expand its business to the multi-family sector, hospitality, and industrial area. Craig Menear, CEO of The Home Depot, says that the purchase gives The Home Depot more opportunity to expand in the maintenance, repair, and operations sector that was previously not successful. In January 2016 Michael Grebe retired leaving Kenneth Sweder as the new CEO. In 2017 Interline Brands was renamed to The Home Depot Pro including its brand names except for U.S. Lock. Wilmar Industries was renamed to The Home Depot Pro Multifamily. Barnett was renamed to The Home Depot Pro Specialty Trades. SupplyWorks was renamed to The Home Depot Pro Institutional.

== Operations ==
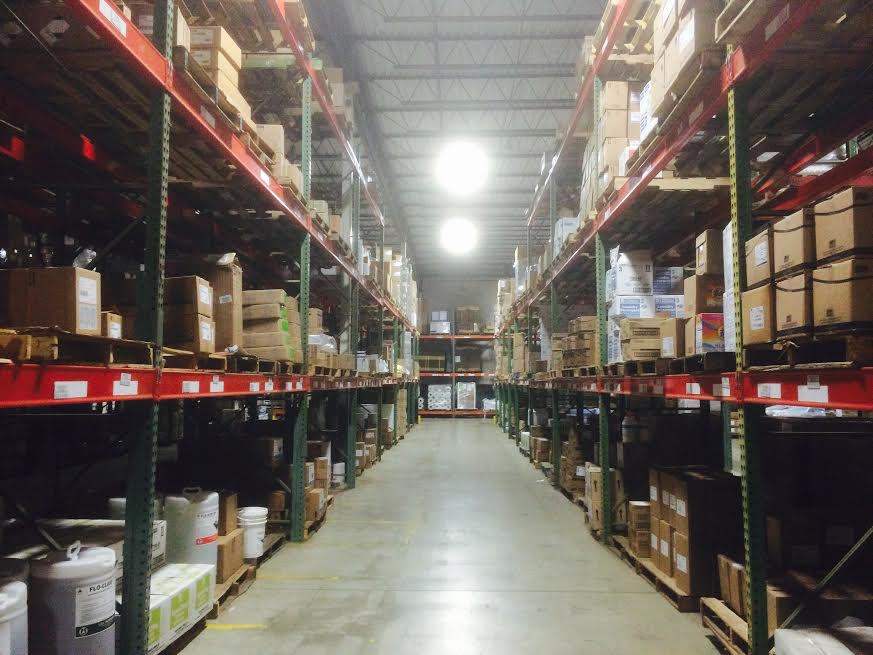
The Home Depot Pro Institutional warehouse.

The company staffs 30 showrooms throughout North America with 70 strategically placed distribution centers stocking over 30,000 products under the brands Wilmar, Barnett, SupplyWorks, Hardware Express, Maintenance USA, U.S. Lock, and Copperfield. Its customer base includes:

- Facilities maintenance businesses servicing multi-family housing facilities, educational institutions, lodging and healthcare facilities, government properties and building service contractors
- Professional contractors who repair, remodel and build residential and non-industrial facilities
- Specialty distributors, including plumbing and hardware retailers.

The Interline companies offer plumbing, electrical, HVAC, security hardware and janitorial products, but nearly half of Interline's sales are plumbing products. Their goal is to provide premium products at competitive prices with same or next-day delivery. "Get It Right. Get It Now." is the company slogan. Products are sold using multiple channels: direct sales by national account representatives or field representatives, telephone sales, customer service representatives, direct marketing through flyers & catalogs, "pro centers", vendor managed inventory, and Internet-based service. Most Interline Distribution Centers include a customer center for over-the-counter sales which Barnett customers prefer. In markets with a large customer base but no distribution center, Interline would look for an existing single-location supply house that could be purchased and turned into a "pro center"—a small contractor showroom and pickup facility that stocks high turnover items. Next day delivery is shipped using Interline Brands delivery trucks. Third party carriers such as UPS and Saia are also used for customers outside of the next day service area. There are also will call or pick up locations at most Interline Brands locations.

Interline Brands contains eight brand names to serve contractors, specialty distributors, housing maintenance and janitorial needs. The products from these brands are stored in distribution centers and contractor showrooms in the United States and Canada.

=== Internationally ===
==== Canada ====
In Ontario, Interline Brands has a distribution center in Mississauga under the Barnett and Sexauer brand. Sexauer, a brand of Interline Brands, had a distribution center in Edmonton and Toronto.

== The Home Depot Pro Multifamily ==
Wilmar Industries
- Industry: Wholesale; Distribution; Retail
- Founded: 1978; 48 years ago Collingswood, New Jersey
- Founder: William "Bill" Green; Martin Green
- Successor: The Home Depot Pro Multifamily
- Headquarters: United States
- Products: Maintenance, repair and operations
- Website: www.wilmar.com

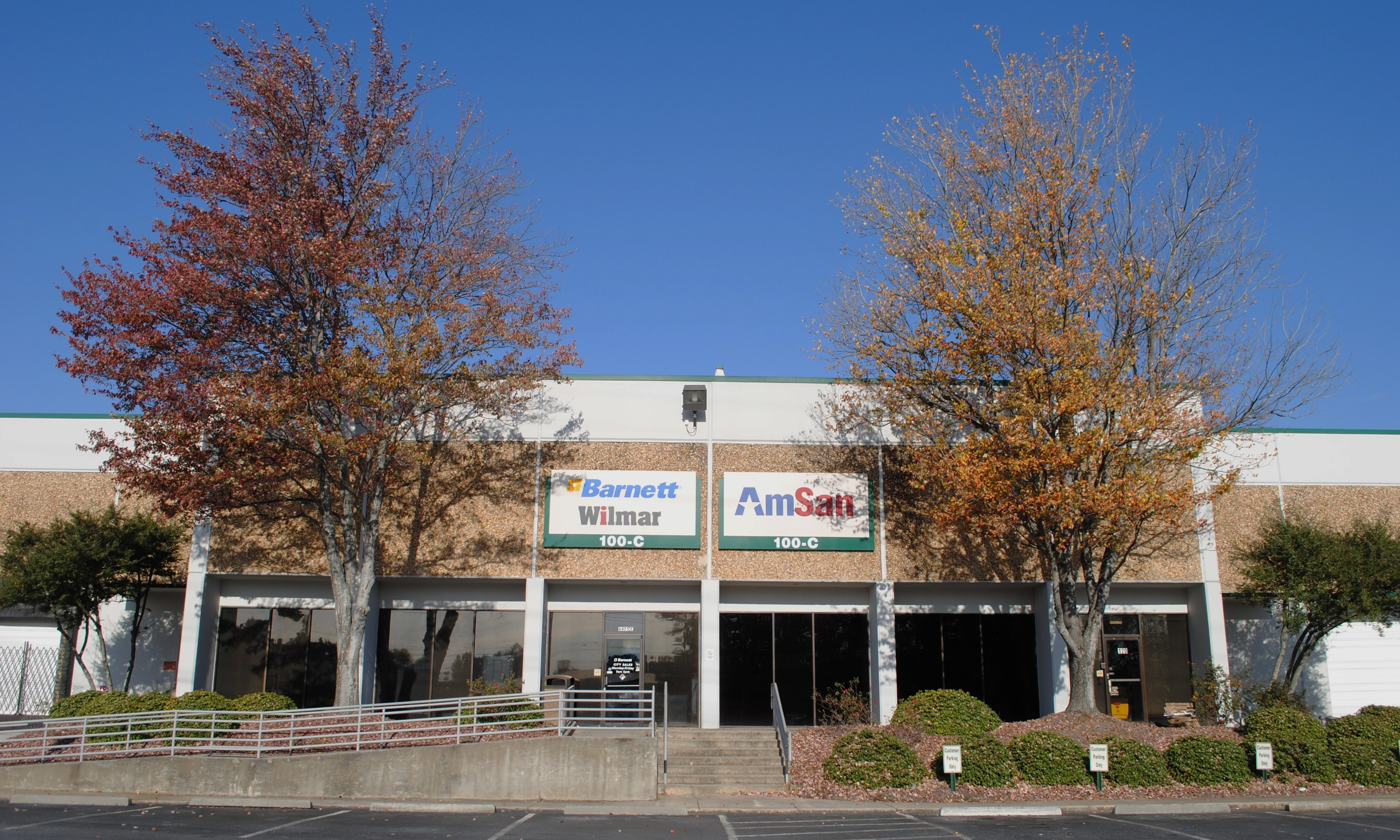
The Home Depot Pro distribution center in Doraville, Georgia.

The Home Depot Pro Multifamily first began as Wilmar Supply Company in 1978 by William Green and Martin Green in Collingswood, New Jersey as a hardware store. Wilmar expanded its retail business by selling MRO products to apartment complexes and multi-family housing. In 1986 William Green became CEO of Wilmar and in 1993 William bought out Martin's interests in Wilmar. The annual revenues of Wilmar escalated from $24.52 million in 1993 to $100.64 million in 1997. In the same year The Pier-Angeli Group, Lindley Plumbing, and Supply Company and Management Supply Company were acquired by Wilmar as part of its strategy of expanding to new markets through the fragmented industry. On January 24, 1996 Wilmar went public and raise over $47 million. Wilmar expanded into the institutional and lodging facilities by acquiring Sexauer and Trayco in December 1999 for $85 million. Wilmar also acquired Ace Maintenance Mart USA, Inc. in 1999.

On January 24, 1996 Wilmar went public as (NASDAQ:WLMR) and raised over $47 million. Wilmar expanded into the institutional and lodging facilities by acquiring Sexauer and Trayco in December 1999 for $85 million. Wilmar went private in May 2000 by investment groups that include Parthenon Capital, The Chase Manhattan Bank (now known as JPMorgan Chase Bank) as trustee for First Plaza Group Trust (a GM Pension Fund), Sterling Investment Partners, BancBoston Capital and Svoboda Capital, LLC. William Green still retained the position of CEO William Green. In 2000 Wilmar, based in Moorestown, New Jersey, purchased Barnett, Inc. for $214 million. Wilmar and its acquisitions became an umbrella company under the name Interline Brands in 2001. Michael J. Grebe became CEO of Wilmar in January 2002 and continued to be CEO until January 1, 2016. After Wilmar acquired Barnett the two companies began a program of integrating operations into streamlining the distribution operations. The logo of Interline Brands is colored after Wilmar with red, black and white.

=== Maintenance USA ===
Maintenance USA is a low price supplier of maintenance, repair and operations products. It was founded in 1974 as Ace Maintenance Mart USA in San Diego, California and acquired by Wilmar in 1999.

=== Sexauer ===
J. A. Sexauer Manufacturing Company was founded in 1921 in Scarsdale, New York by James A. Sexauer. Sexauer was a specialty plumbing parts repair manufacturer and distributor. In December 1999 Wilmar Industries acquired Sexauer from the Dyson-Kissner-Moran Corp. for $85 million. J.A. Sexauer's subsidiary Sexauer, Ltd., based in Toronto, was also acquired by Wilmar. The acquisitions of J.A. Sexauer Manufacturing, Sexauer Ltd., and a similar business called Trayco by Wilmar were referred to as the Sexauer Group. In 2000 Wilmar and Barnett merged to form an umbrella company called Interline Brands. In March 2010 Sexauer added Kohler plumbing products to its plumbing inventory. It is now part of SupplyWorks which then became part of The Home Depot Pro Institutional.

=== Trayco ===
Trayco was founded in 1993 in Florence, South Carolina. Trayco distributes plumbing supplies, light fixtures, and maintenance parts to wholesale retailers or housing units. It is now part of SupplyWorks.

== U.S. Lock ==
Logo of U.S. Lock.

U.S. Lock has a wide variety of security locks and accessories from padlocks to door handles. The five national distribution centers for U.S. Lock are located in Brentwood, San Bernardino, Louisville, Charlotte and Jacksonville. U.S. Lock first began as Lawrence Locksmith Supply Corporation in 1974 in Rockville Centre, New York. In 1988 it was acquired by Waxman Industries, Inc. and renamed U.S. Lock. In 1998 Barnett, Inc. acquired U.S. Lock from Waxman Industries, Inc. for $33 million. U.S. Lock is the only former brand of Interline Brands that retained its name after the acquisition by The Home Depot.

== The Home Depot Pro Specialty Trades ==
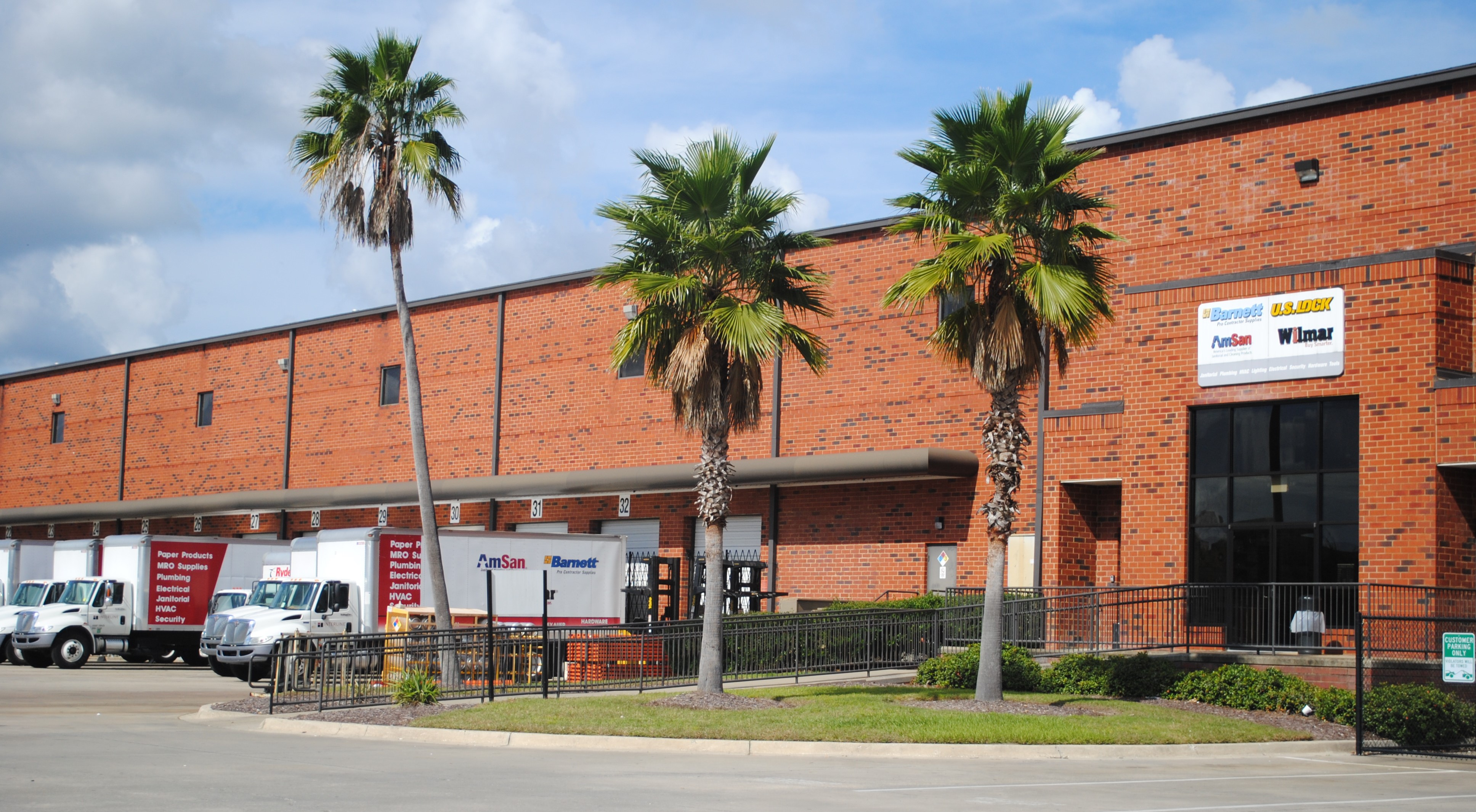
The Home Depot Pro distribution center in Jacksonville, Florida.

Barnett
- Industry: Wholesale; Distribution; Retail
- Founded: 1958; 68 years ago Jacksonville, Florida
- Successor: The Home Depot Pro Specialty Trades
- Headquarters: United States
- Products: Maintenance, repair and operations
- Website: www.ebarnett.com

Leran Gas Products
- Industry: Wholesale; Distribution; Retail
- Founded: 1968; 58 years ago
- Headquarters: United States
- Products: Propane accessories
- Website: www.e-leran.com

The Home Depot Pro Specialty Trades first began as Barnett in 1958 as Barnett Tube Fitting and Valve Company by the Leonard Barnett family. The initial purpose of Barnett was to supply copper tubing to customers through its catalog. In 1972 Barnett changed to Barnett Brass & Copper. Barnett was acquired by Waxman Industries for $12.5 million giving Barnett access to the mail-order market. Waxman Industries formed Barnett, Inc. in 1993 and two years later it reached $100 million in sales.

In April 1996 Barnett went public and completed its IPO. Learn Gas Products was acquired by Barnett from Waxman Industries. In November 1997 Forbes ranked Barnett as 60th of the Top 200 Best Small Companies in America. By the end of 1997, Barnett had mailed over 4.5 million flyers for its new 1,800 products. The result of the mailings added 38,000 new customers. In 1998 Barnett, Inc. acquired U.S. Lock from Waxman Industries, Inc. for $33 million. Barnett established its headquarters in the LaVilla neighborhood in downtown Jacksonville, Florida in May 1998. By the end of 1998 Barnett also acquired U.S. Lock from Waxman Industries for $33 million.

Waxman Industries, which owned 44% of Barnett, underwent a plan of financial restructuring that included the sale of its Barnett stock by December 2000. With Barnett now private the New Jersey company Wilmar Industries acquired Barnett in 2000 for $214 million due to its similar operations.

=== Leran Gas Products ===
Leran Gas Products was established in 1968 as a business-to-business distributor of propane gas products to the liquefied petroleum gas industry of the United States. It is the only national distributor of propane gas products such as Noritz, Tracpipe, and Marshall Excelsior. Barnett acquired Leran Gas Products in 1997.

=== Hardware Express ===
Hardware Express is a supplier for hardware retailers and wholesalers that focuses on a quick response to high-velocity items and daily deliveries. Products of Hardware Express are sold through a 17,000 item catalog, direct mail marketing, inside sales representatives, or online. Hardware Express was acquired by Barnett and is a brand of Interline Brands.

== The Home Depot Pro Institutional ==
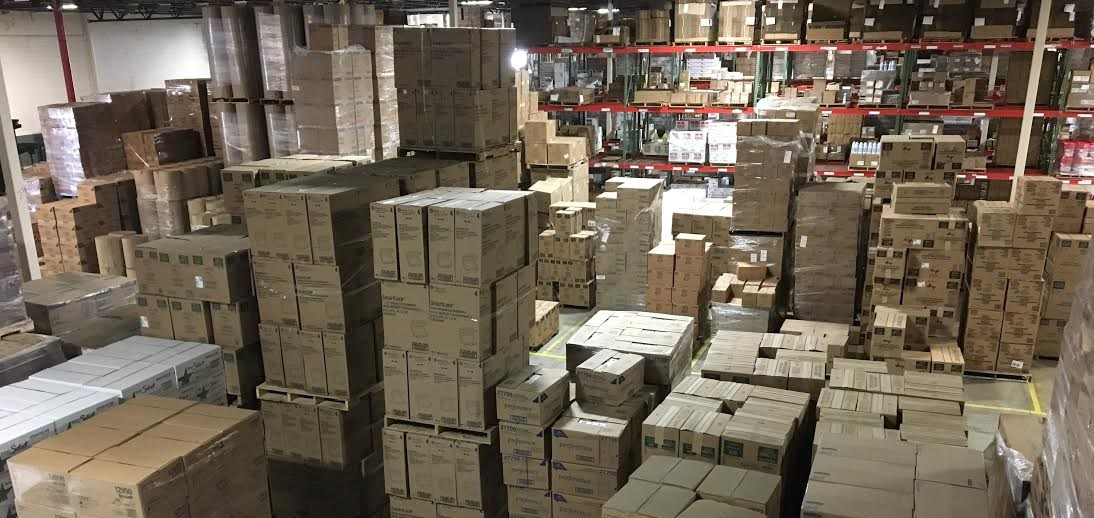
The Home Depot Pro Institutional in Greenville

The Home Depot Pro Institutional
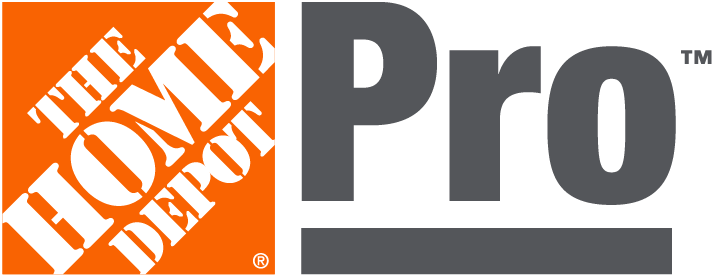
- Formerly: SupplyWorks
- Type: Subsidiary
- Industry: Wholesale; Distribution; Retail
- Predecessor: Sexauer; JanPak; AmSan; CleanSource; Trayco
- Founded: 2015; 11 years ago
- Headquarters: United States
- Products: Janitorial, sanitary, packaging, MRO, disposable food packaging
- Website: www.supplyworks.com

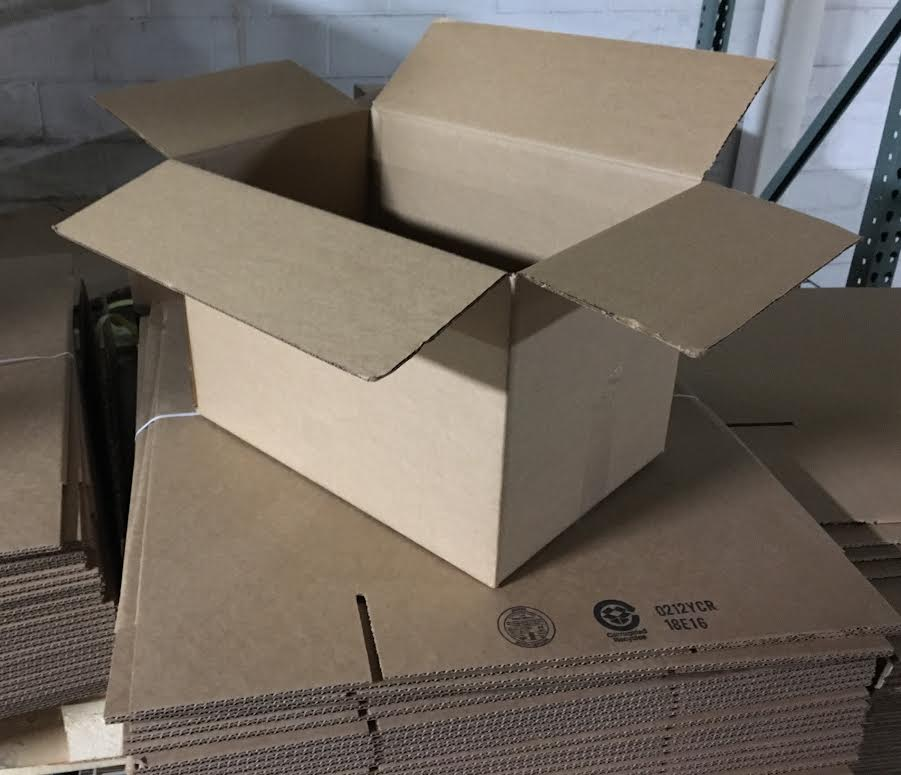
Corrugated boxes from a SupplyWorks warehouse.

The Home Depot Pro Institutional first began as the Interline Brands subsidiary SupplyWorks. SupplyWorks was the result of five previous brands acquired over time by Interline Brands and merged into one unified brand. The re-branding makes SupplyWorks easier to grow under one brand instead of multiple brands. President & COO President & COO Kenneth Sweder says on the creation of SupplyWorks, "The launch of SupplyWorks punctuates the growth strategy we've been pursuing to build a leading share position in the highly fragmented institutional facilities maintenance end market". The products of SupplyWorks produce $850 million, making up half of Interline Brands annual revenue. Supply stands for products and the Works represent everything the products do for the customer.

The products of SupplyWorks consist of a variety of cleaning solutions and janitorial supplies. There are over 3,000 brand supply partners of SupplyWorks such as Georgia-Pacific, Dart Container, 3M, Diversey, Kimberly-Clark and Spartan. SupplyWorks also has products unrelated to janitorial brands such as corrugated boxes, disposable food packaging and MRO products. Products can be purchased online or through a sales representative. After The Home Depot acquired Interline Brands it had also acquired the SupplyWorks brand. The Home Depot renamed SupplyWorks to The Home Depot Pro Institutional in 2019.

=== Operations ===
SupplyWorks has over 68 distribution centers throughout the United States along with 100 delivery vehicles. Next day delivery is shipped using SupplyWorks delivery trucks. Third party carriers such as UPS is also used for customers outside of the next day service area. There are also will call or pick up locations at most SupplyWorks locations. The customer base of SupplyWorks is property management, contractors, health care and educational facilities.

The logo of SupplyWorks.

=== Marketing ===
After the re-branding of JanPak, CleanSource, Trayco, AmSan, and Sexauer into SupplyWorks, the new company applied a marketing strategy to increase revenue with expanded customers. The announcement of the new brand SupplyWorks was made at EverBank Field, with fireworks and a promotional video on the scoreboard to start the new brand announcement. CEO Michael Grebe said that "it's easier to grow one brand instead of five." The SupplyWorks brand is also advertised on the scoreboard during Jacksonville Jaguars games. By being under one unified brand, SupplyWorks can now nationalize the commercial building supply business. The AmSan brand Renown is still distributed by SupplyWorks and marketed under Interline Brands.

The company has a website and mobile app, with customer tools to create favorites lists, custom catalogs, and bin labels.

== Exclusive Products ==
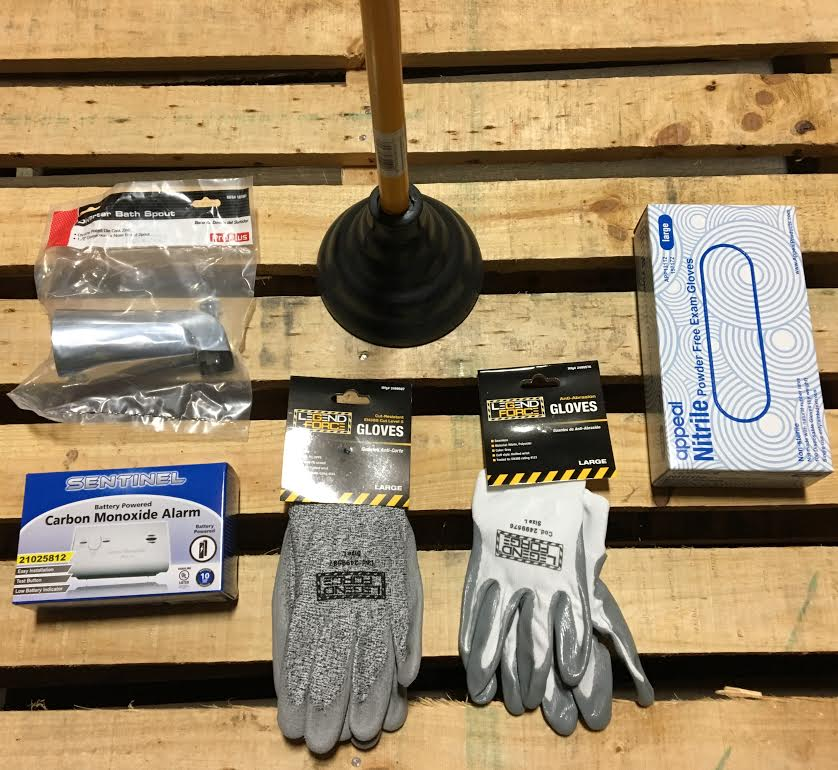
ProPlus, Sentinel, Legend Force, and Appeal products.

Interline Brands has several exclusive products streamlined under Wilmar, Barnett, Maintenance USA, Hardware Express, US Lock and SupplyWorks.

- Anvil Mark - Door hardware
- Appeal - Paper towels, Toilet paper
- Bala - Ceiling fans
- Designer's Touch - Window blinds
- DuraPro - Toilet accessories
- Garrison - HVAC units
- Legend - Door handles
- Legend Force - Safety accessories
- Monument - Exhaust and ventiliation fans
- Premier - Plumbing supplies
- Preferred Industries - AC power plugs and sockets accessories
- PremierPlus - Bathroom accessories, Piping and plumbing fitting, Plumbing supplies
- ProPlus - Bathroom accessories
- Sentinel - Smoke detectors and Carbon monoxide detectors
- Yukon

=== Renown ===
Renown is a private-label product owned by Interline Brands since the acquisition of AmSan in 2006. Renown consists of cleaning and janitorial products, such as trash bags, paper towels, toilet paper, cleaning agents, rubber gloves, and mops. It is currently marketed under the SupplyWorks brand.
