= Hannibal Square Heritage Center =

Coordinates: 28.5957°N 81.3576°W

The Hannibal Square Heritage Center
- Established: 2007
- Location: Winter Park, Florida
- Type: Art museum
- Website: hannibalsquareheritagecenter.org

The Hannibal Square Heritage Center is a community center in Winter Park, Florida which is run by the Crealdé School of Art. Founded in 2007, the Hannibal Square Heritage Center is located in a historical neighborhood on New England Avenue two blocks west of Park Avenue, between Virginia and Pennsylvania Avenues. Operating and programming costs are funded by Crealdé School of Art, the Community Redevelopment Agency of the City of Winter Park, United Arts of Central Florida and the Division of Cultural Affairs through the State of Florida.

== Mission statement ==
Its mission is to pay tribute to the past, present and future contributions of Winter Park's African-American community. Through innovative programming in the arts and humanities, they hope to inspire all Central Floridians to become more aware of, respect, explore and participate in their own community's history and heritage.

== History ==
In 1880, South Florida Railroad laid a track connecting Orlando to Sanford. Winter Park was built around that track. Hannibal Square (the "west side") in Winter Park was officially founded in 1881. Black families who lived in that area provided labor that built the town as well as domestic service to wealthy white families. This resulted in educational opportunities, prosperity and professional standing for its black residents. Gus Henderson, a print shop owner, rallied black registered voters to cast their vote to make Winter Park an official city. The election, which occurred on October 12, 1887, incorporated the town of Winter Park in its boundaries. They adopted a city council and seven men were elected as aldermen. Two black men from Hannibal Square, Walter B. Simpson and Frank R. Israel, were among those appointed. With the goal of preserving the cultural heritage of the area, Community Center Director Ron Moore and Crealdé Executive Director and documentary photographer Peter Schreyer held an event called Heritage Day. The first Heritage Day was held in March 2002. Dozens of local residents shared their family photographs and histories. There were several more Heritage Days which resulted in their permanent collection, The Heritage Collection: Photographs and Oral Histories of West Winter Park. It was displayed at the Winter Park Community Center. Due to both lack of space and its popularity residents of Winter Park wanted to see the collection in a permanent space. On April 28, 2007, the City of Winter Park and Crealdé School of Art opened the new Hannibal Square Heritage Center.

== Exhibits ==
- The Heritage Collection: Photographs and Oral Histories of West Winter Park – 1st Floor - This collection of over one hundred historic photographs is the first collection of its kind in Central Florida. The photographs date as far back as the 1880s up to the present and are accompanied by personal accounts of community life. Starting in 2002, a team of historians, cultural anthropologists, and documentary photographers collaborated with members of the Hannibal Square neighborhood (west side of Winter Park) who shared their family photographs and stories during six Community Heritage Days. The stories are beautifully displayed in frames with black and white prints of the shared photographs along with pictures of the residents who shared the stories.
- The Hannibal Square Timeline - 1st Floor - This timeline includes local events such as the 1911 founding of the Bethel Missionary Baptist Church on Welbourne Avenue in Hannibal Square. It also includes significant national events in African American history such as the election of President Barack Obama.
- Family History Research Library - 2nd Floor – Provided by the Unity Heritage Festival Foundation, volunteers will help you trace your roots using documents and various genealogy research tools including DNA testing. To meet with them is free but if you choose to do DNA testing there is a fee. They are members of the International Society of Genetic Genealogists.
- Community Workshops by Visiting Artists- Every year, The Crealdé School of Art collaborates with professional artists and members of the community to create public art pieces as part of their permanent collection. One of those pieces is the Hannibal Square Memory Wall located outside the museum. This wall sculpture was created in 2008 with artist Mr. Imagination and members of the local community including local artists, school children and seniors.

== Traveling Exhibits ==
On the second floor there is a gallery that hosts travelling exhibitions which change three to four times a year. These exhibitions include quilt making, painting, sculptures, and other mediums by professional artists.

== Educational Programs ==
- Heritage Collection Days: Provides an opportunity for present and former residents to add to their permanent collection, The Heritage Collection: Photographs and Oral Histories of West Winter Park.
- Free Art Sampler for Seniors: Weekly classes for seniors to learn painting, drawing, printmaking and ceramics. Classes are taught by Crealdé faculty and offered in partnership with Seniors First Lunch Program.
- Free Art Sampler for Children: Weekly classes for students ages 5 to 10 in the fundamentals of sculpting, drawing, and painting. Classes are taught by Crealdé faculty and offered in partnership with the Boys & Girls Club.
- "What Heritage Means to Me" Field Workshop and Trip Program: This program is for students in grades 4–9. It consists of an interactive tour of the Heritage Center followed by a visual art workshop in which students create a collaborative piece of folk art incorporating their personal experience of heritage.

== Annual Events ==
- They host an annual artist's residency with guest artists who engage the community in a public art project. Participants in the workshops learn the craft of each artist as they work together on a piece of artwork that uses personal and family experience as inspiration. The artwork becomes part of their permanent collection.

== Facility Rentals ==
The 3000-square foot Heritage Center Facility can accommodate up to 50 people for tours. Additionally, they have two meeting rooms available with capacities of 15 and 25. They also allow use of their small kitchen to accommodate catering.
