= Crealdé School of Art =

Coordinates: 28.6032°N 81.3215°W

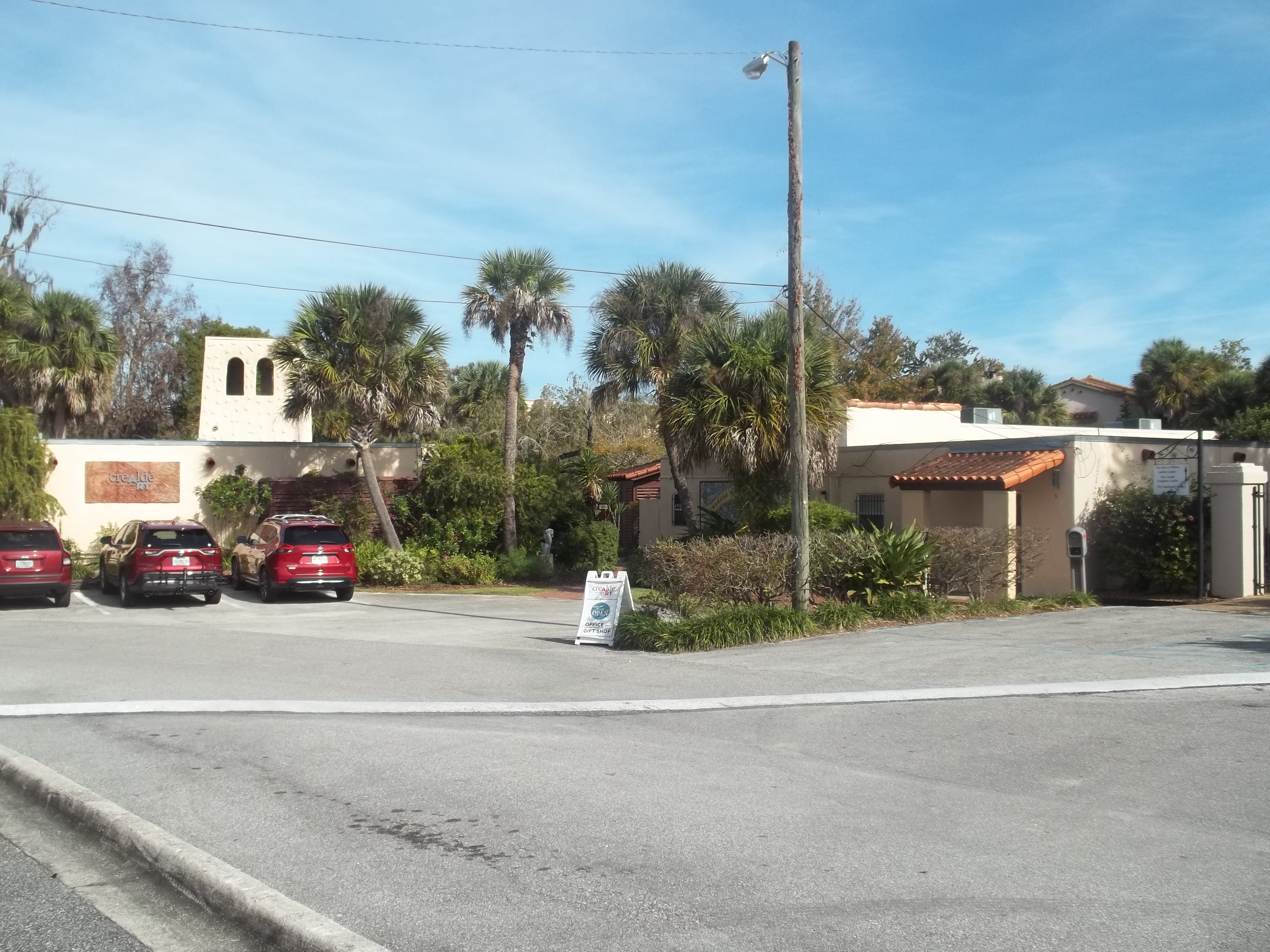
- Crealdé School of Art in 2019
- Formation: 1975; 51 years ago
- Type: Non-profit arts organization
- Legal status: Active
- Headquarters: Winter Park, Florida
- Executive Director & CEO: Emily Bourmas-Fry
- Subsidiaries: Hannibal Square Heritage Center
- Website: crealde.org

The Crealdé School of Art is a non-profit arts organization in Winter Park, Florida. Opened in 1975, the school offers visual and three-dimensional arts classes for all ages, a summer art camp, and a visiting artist workshop series.

== Mission statement ==
Its mission is to stimulate the creative process inherent in each individual through hands-on visual-arts education and to cultivate a lifelong aesthetic appreciation in people of all ages and backgrounds. This mission is realized through comprehensive studio art instruction and interaction with professional working artists, presentation of gallery exhibitions and related art activities that encourage art exploration, an extensive outreach program that services at-risk minority youth and seniors, and fostering an appreciation for cultural diversity and the preservation of our cultural heritage.

== Exhibits ==
The school features two exhibition galleries and an outdoor sculpture garden that are open to the public at its main campus at 600 St. Andrews Boulevard. Exhibits include works by Florida artists, national and international artists, and the school's students.

== Hannibal Square Heritage Center ==
Opened in 2007, Hannibal Square Heritage Center is a museum of African American art, history and heritage that was founded by the Crealdé School of Art in partnership with area residents and the City of Winter Park. It is located at 642 West New England Avenue. The Center features photos and oral histories, and changing exhibits of art, history and culture.

== Website ==
- Official website
- Hannibal Square Heritage Center website
