= JanPak =

JanPak Inc.

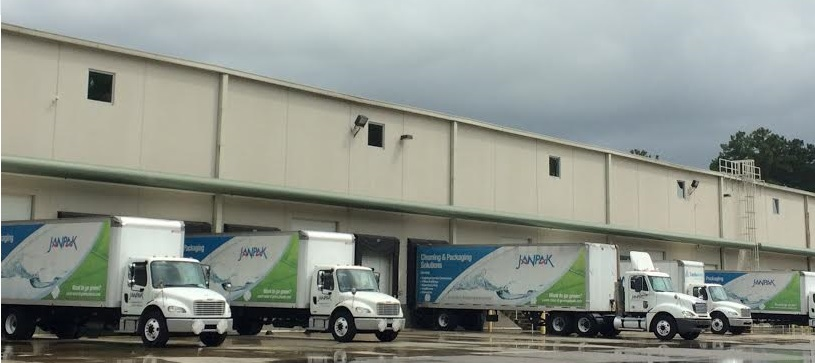
- JanPak facility in Jacksonville, Florida
- Company type: Private
- Industry: Wholesale/Distribution (business)/Retail
- Founded: 1945 as Paper Supply Company
- Successor: SupplyWorks
- Headquarters: Jacksonville, Florida, USA
- Area served: United States, Canada, United States Virgin Islands, Puerto Rico
- Products: Janitorial, sanitary, packaging products
- Parent: Interline Brands
- Subsidiaries: Pro Star Janitorial; Advance Paper Company

JanPak was a regional supplier of cleaning, janitorial and packaging products. It operates 17 distribution centers in the Central and Southeastern United States with over 100 delivery trucks. The headquarters of JanPak is in Davidson, North Carolina.

Interline Brands acquired JanPak in 2012 and was renamed to SupplyWorks in 2015. The Home Depot acquired Interline Brands in 2015 and in 2017 SupplyWorks was renamed to The Home Depot Pro Institutional.

== History ==
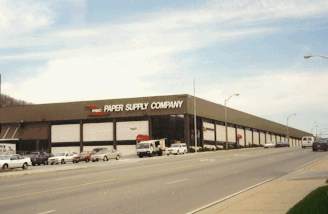
Paper Supply Company in Bluefield, West Virginia around 1998.

Janpak was founded in 1945 in Bluefield, West Virginia by James Shott, H. I. Shott, Jr., James Tilson, L. M. Kerley Sr. and B. L. Early. It was first called Paper Supply Company until 2000 when the name changed to JanPak Inc. Mike Shott, James Shott's grandson, was serving as company chair of the board directors at the time of the name change to JanPak. The name changed to JanPak to unite its sister branches who each were known by a different name. By 2003 JanPak had over 12,000 customers in 15 states. In 2005 JanPak consolidated its offices in Dallas and Fort Worth to a 32,000 square foot facility in Fort Worth. Operations of JanPak were expanded in 2007 with a new distribution center in Houston, Texas.

In June 2008 JanPak acquired a distributor of janitorial supplies called Pro Star Janitorial based in Port Arthur, Texas. On May 21, 2008, JanPak hosted a Green Seminar in Dallas, Texas featuring over 100 of the region's leading contractors and environmental services leaders. JanPak expanded its operations with a $1 million investment in a distribution center in West Columbia, South Carolina in 2009. Two years later JanPak expanded with a distribution center in Orlando, Florida to serve customers in Central Florida. In April 2012 JanPak acquired a distributor of cleaning supplies called Advance Paper Company based in Chattanooga, Tennessee. Advance Paper markets cleaning supplies in Chattanooga, Knoxville and North Georgia.

In December 2012 Interline Brands acquired JanPak for $82 million. President of JanPak Tim Feheeley says that the acquisition of JanPak would "deliver to our customers even broader capabilities and enhanced service." The headquarters of JanPak moved from Davidson, North Carolina to Jacksonville, Florida upon the acquisition by Interline Brands. The operations of JanPak were streamlined with the brands of Interline Brands increasing the sales and inventory of JanPak. JanPak generated $232 million in sales with a net income of $2.2 million in the same year of its acquisition. JanPak also signed a lease for an 84,000 square feet warehouse in Jacksonville. In March 2015 Interline Brands merged five of its thirteen brands, including JanPak, into one unified brand called SupplyWorks.

== Operations ==
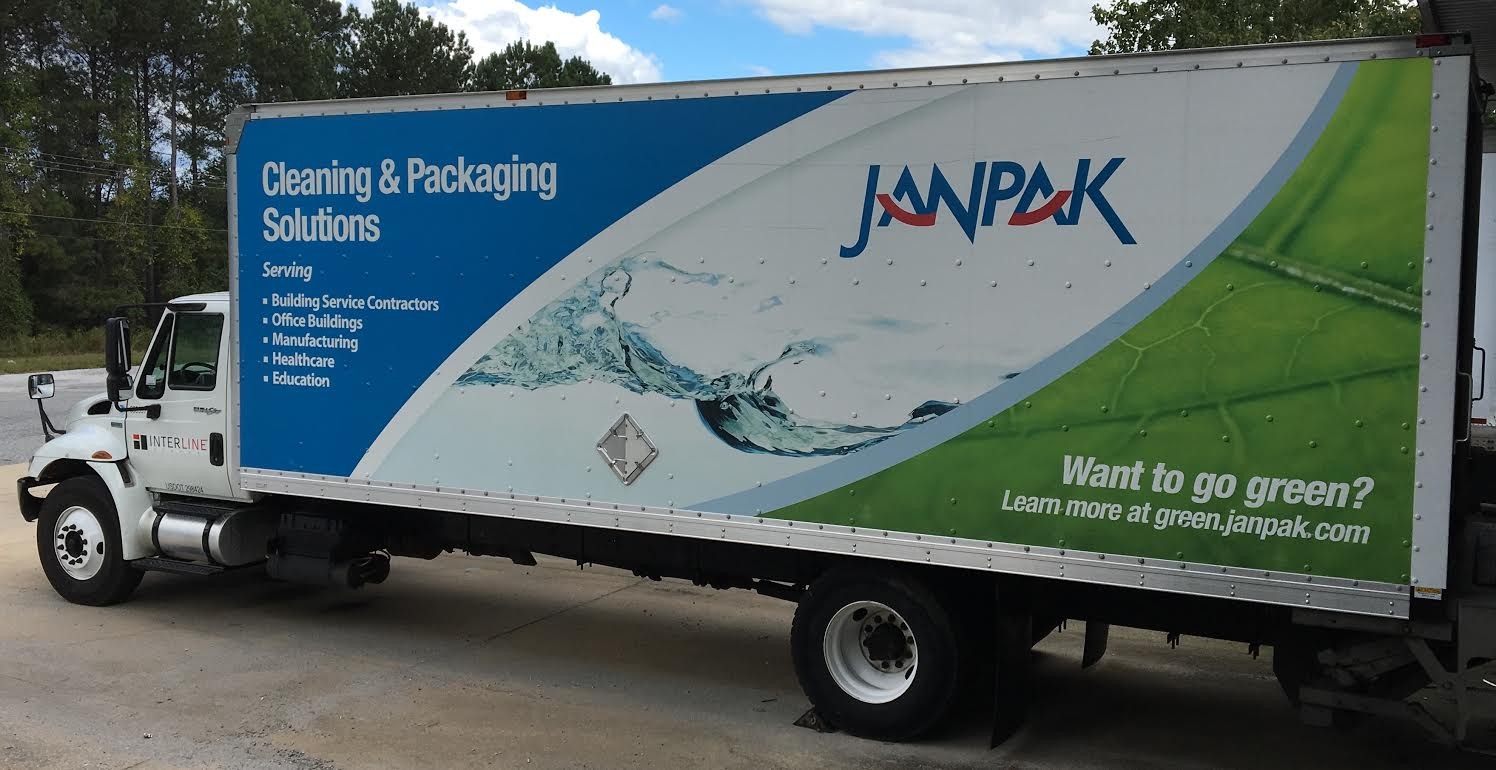
JanPak delivery truck in Piedmont, South Carolina.

The headquarters of JanPak was first at Bluefield, West Virginia but moved to Davidson, North Carolina near Charlotte. The corporate operations center of JanPak still remains in Bluefield. JanPak has 17 distribution centers in the Southeastern United States and with $200 million of daily inventory. Through the distribution centers JanPak primarily serves health care facilities, educational institutions, and property management to over 100,000 customers. There are over 100 delivery trucks used to deliver products to customers at each regional distribution center. JanPak utilizes the programs JanPak Academy, CleanZone, and QLSS to help customers with lower costs, how to use products efficiently and green practices.

JanPak operations are made up of janitorial and packaging products. Janitorial products distributed by JanPak consists of toilet paper, paper towels, soap, trash can liners, and mops. Several branded janitorial products that JanPak supplies is 3M, Diversey, Kimberly-Clark, and Georgia-Pacific. Corrugated boxes, stretch wrap, packing tape, and bubble wrap are some of the packaging products distributed by JanPak. Foodservice products such as paper cups, food container, and plastic utensils are also distributed by JanPak. Wilmar, CleanSource, and AmSan of Interline Brands are streamlined with operations of JanPak for more efficiency with its customer base.

== Paper Supply Company ==
Paper Supply Company was founded in 1945 as a packaging and janitorial distributor. Paper Supply Company expanded over time to the southeastern United States with branches and sister companies bearing the name Paper Company. In 2000, Paper Supply Company and its sister branches changed to the name JanPak. The name change to JanPak was used to create more efficiency and unity among its companies which all had different names but the same operations.

Paper Supply Companies
Paper Supply Company	Bluefield, West Virginia
Charlotte Paper Company	Davidson, North Carolina
Paper Supply Company	Winston-Salem, North Carolina
Anniston/Gadsden Paper & Supply Company	Gadsden, Alabama
Greenville Paper Company	Greenville, South Carolina
Charleston Paper Company	Charleston, South Carolina
