= AmSan =

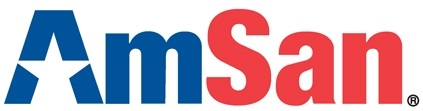
- Company type: Private
- Industry: Wholesale/Distribution (business)/Retail
- Founded: 1987
- Successor: SupplyWorks
- Area served: United States, Canada, United States Virgin Islands, Puerto Rico
- Products: Janitorial & sanitary products
- Parent: Interline Brands

AmSan, officially American Sanitary Incorporated, was a janitorial and cleaning products distributor in the United States. It was the largest national distributor that focused on providing janitorial products, with revenues over $300 million. It was merged with four brands of Interline Brands, forming a new brand called SupplyWorks.

== History ==
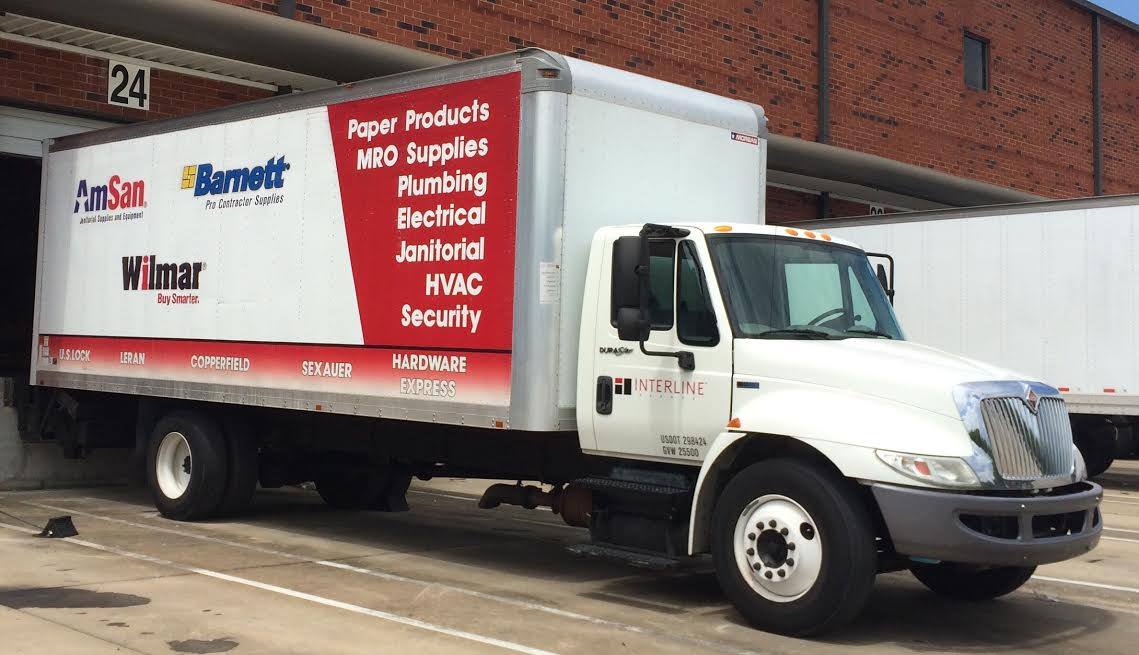
AmSan logo on an Interline Brands delivery truck

In the 1990s, AmSan became a conglomerate by buying 44 independent janitorial and sanitary distributors. Some of AmSan's acquisitions are AmSan Eve, AmSan Vonachen-Elton, AmSan Nogg Chemical & Paper, and AmSan West. In 2002, Michael Mulhern became CEO of AmSan. Mulhern moved the headquarters of AmSan from Raleigh, North Carolina to Chicago, Illinois. Under Mulhern, AmSan underwent a series of reforms dedicated to increasing profitability. AmSan turned over 40% of its top 35 executives, downsized its office operations and downsized its underperforming distribution centers. AmSan created its own line of products with Renown. Renown represented 20% of AmSan's total revenue. By 2005, AmSan had revenues totaling $300 million. American Capital invested $25 million in the recapitalization of AmSan in 2005. Interline Brands acquired AmSan in May 2006 for $127.5 million. AmSan West, which has operations in Sacramento and Los Angeles, was not acquired by Interline Brands. In 2008, AmSan established sales and distribution territories in Columbus, Cleveland, Pittsburgh, Atlanta and Nashville. In 2009, a showroom and walk-in store were established in Fort Myers, Florida. In December 2013, AmSan established a partnership with a non-profit organization called Didlake that provides opportunities for those with disabilities to work on Renown products.

=== Products ===
AmSan supplies over 40,000 products to over 50,000 customers. AmSan consists of national brands such as 3M, GOJO, Spartan, Rubbermaid and Georgia-Pacific. Products from AmSan could be purchased through its website or catalog.

== Renown ==
AmSan's exclusive brand is Renown, which makes up 20% of the total revenue and is distributed through Interline Brands. Renown comes in a variety of products, such as latex gloves, paper towels and cleaning chemicals.

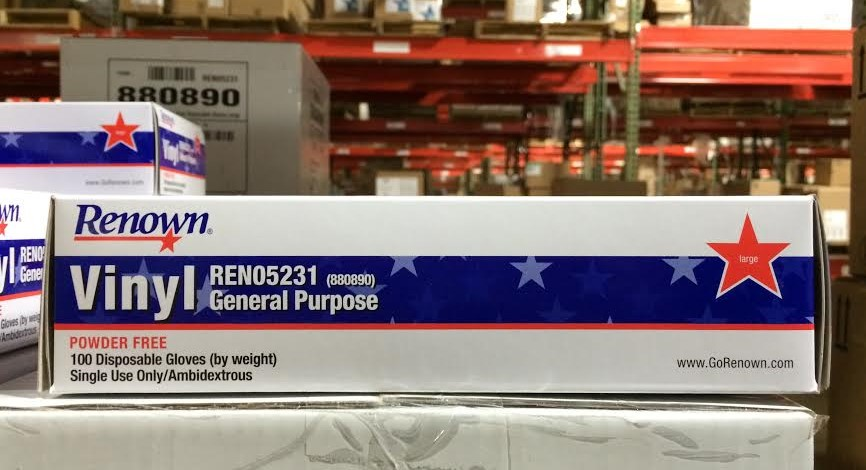
Renown latex gloves

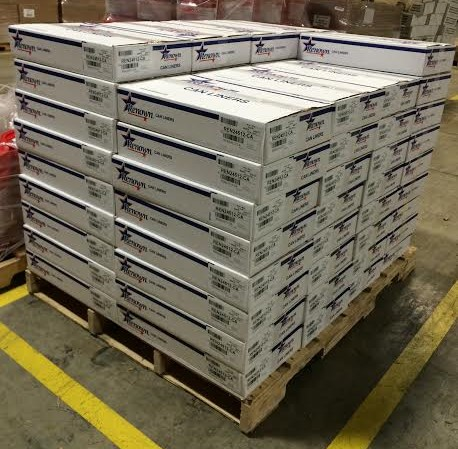
Renown trash can liners

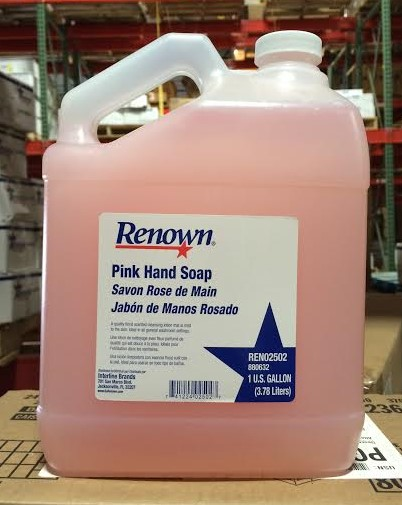
Renown hand soap

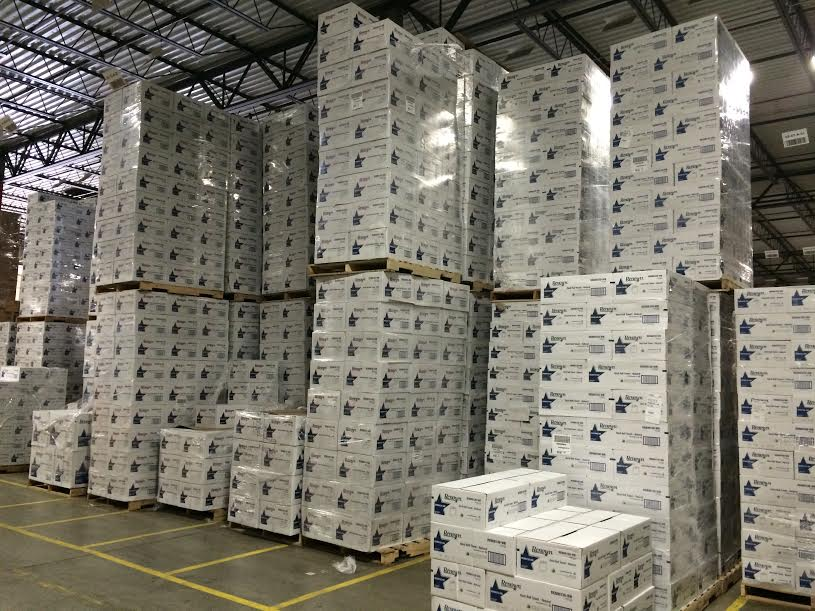
Renown cases of paper towels and toilet paper
