= Spencer Pompey =

American teacher and civil rights activist (1915 - 2001)

Charles Spencer Pompey (1915 - 2001) was a teacher, principal, coach, civil rights activist, and author in Florida. He challenged lower pay rates for African American teachers, exclusion of African Americans from public beaches, and college tuition for African American students segregated out of state schools.

He taught, coached, and became principal of Carver High School in Delray Beach. His wife published his manuscript More Rivers to Cross after his death.

The Florida Archives have 11 color slides of him. The Spady Cultural Heritage Museum has a documentary video about him inckuding his successes as a football coach.

== Books ==
He wrote:

- Like A Mighty Banyan : Contributions of Black People to the History of Palm Beach County (1982)
- More Rivers to Cross : A Forty Year Look at the Quest for Fair and Equitable Fulfillment of the "American dream", 1940-1980
