= Stellar (construction company) =

American construction and engineering company

- Company type: Private
- Industry: Construction
- Founded: 1985
- Headquarters: Jacksonville, Florida, USA
- Key people: Ronald Foster Jr., Chairman; Brian Kappele, CEO; Scott Mark, COO; Clint Pyle, Chief Financial Officer
- Services: Design-Build, General Contracting, Construction Management, Architecture, Engineering, Refrigeration and Energy Systems Fabrication/Installation (Self-Perform), Mechanical Services, Quality Assurance and Job-Site Safety, Automation & Controls, Instrumentation and Programming, Utility and Energy Management, Real Estate Services, Thermal Insulation and Roofing
- Revenue: $885 million (2017)
- Number of employees: 750+ (2018)
- Website: www.stellar.net

Stellar is a privately owned design, engineering, construction, and mechanical services firm headquartered in Jacksonville, Florida. It has designed and built projects for a wide range of clientele, including Starbucks, Nestlé, Walt Disney World, and numerous others. Stellar employs more than 750 people, including architects, engineers, constructors, refrigeration specialists, and technicians.

== History ==
Stellar was founded as the Stellar Group in 1985 in Jacksonville, Florida by Ron Foster, Sr. and four other associates. Its first project involved the renovation and construction of condominiums and a marina at the Epping Forest Yacht Club. Stellar went on to specialize in the design and construction of food processing facilities and low-temperature distribution firms, often building refrigerated warehouses. Stellar's early clients included beverage company, Tropicana Products. It broke ground on Tropicana's Bradenton, Florida-based headquarters in 1989.

Over the course of the next decade, Stellar expanded its services by developing a commercial division with projects including religious establishments, automobile dealerships, and health care facilities. It also opened a power and utilities division to construct cooling systems for power plants and other structures. By 2002, the firm had worked on a variety of projects for clients including JEA, General Mills, and Nestlé. With Nestlé, Stellar was responsible for the design and construction of a $250-million food processing plant that began in Arkansas in 2002. The company also served as general contractor on the $850-million mixed-use development at the former Jacksonville Shipyards.

In 2007, the firm officially changed its name from the "Stellar Group" to "Stellar." In 2008, it began serving as the construction manager for the new sanctuary at Hendricks Avenue Baptist Church in Jacksonville, a project that was completed in around one year. Also in 2008, Stellar began work on the Heinz food processing plant in Florence County, South Carolina. The firm was responsible for the plant architecture and all construction services at the 225,000 square-foot facility which opened in August 2011. In 2013, Stellar began work on Nestlé's research and development facility in Solon, Ohio again providing architectural and construction services.

In 2015, Stellar completed construction of a 117,000-square-foot soluble coffee plant in Augusta, Georgia for Starbucks. The plant, which had been in construction for three years, produces the coffee company's VIA line of instant coffee products. Food Engineering Magazine named it the "Fabulous Food Plant" of the year in 2015. In 2016, the firm completed a $7.6-million renovation of the Walt Disney World Resort's Shades of Green, a resort complex aimed at military personnel and their families. The renovation was completed to house athletes for the Invictus Games in 2016, and further renovations of the 283-room Magnolia Wing began in 2018. Another Stellar project—the 160,000 square-foot Bell & Evans poultry packaging, storage, and frozen processing plant in Fredericksburg, Pennsylvania—was named the "Fabulous Food Plant" by Food Engineering Magazine in 2016. Stellar was again chosen as the design-build firm for the $260-million expansion of the Bell & Evans facility in 2018.

In 2018, Stellar completed the $18-million renovation of Herrmann Hall, a historic lodging facility at the Naval Postgraduate School in Monterey, California. In 2019, Stellar completed a renovation of the Tom Bush Volkswagen dealership in Jacksonville. It was one of numerous renovations that Stellar had completed for the Tom Bush family of dealerships, including the Tom Bush Collision Center and Tom Bush BMW. A $2.1-million renovation of the Tom Bush Mazda dealership in Orange Park, Florida was completed the following year. Later in 2020, Stellar completed a renovation of the Ilima Pool complex at the Hale Koa Hotel on the Hawaiian island of Oahu.

In 2021, Stellar finished a renovation of the Florida Panthers' IceDen facility, replacing the building's ammonia-based refigeration system with an air-cooled one. In 2022, the firm started on multiple new projects, including the expansion of a Jack Link's distribution center in Iowa and construction of a new museum and multi-use complex for the Museum of Science and History in Jacksonville.

== Operations ==
Stellar provides services to commercial and industrial clients in various markets including food and beverage; refrigeration and cold storage; military; automotive; educational; healthcare; institutional; hospitality; power and utilities; and office properties. It delivers the following services: planning, design, pre-construction, construction, refrigeration, mechanical and utility, building envelope, and total operations maintenance. Stellar is headquartered in Jacksonville, Florida with offices and other locations in Wisconsin, California, Texas, Colorado, Pennsylvania, and elsewhere.

== Philanthropy ==
In 2006, the company founded the Stellar Foundation to make its charitable giving process more formalized and begin accepting applications for yearly grants. The company has also begun matching individual employee charitable contributions up to $1,000. Also in 2006, the company began sponsoring pre-engineering and mechanical drafting education at the Allen D. Nease Senior High School. The program would later be termed the Stellar Academy of Engineering. In 2017, the Jacksonville Business Journal recognized Stellar as one of that year's "Partners in Philanthropy." The company gave an estimated $250,000 to nonprofit organizations in 2016.
