= JM Family Enterprises =

Automotive & Services company in Deerfield Beach, Florida, U.S.

- Type: Private
- Industry: Automotive industry
- Founded: October 26, 1968; 58 years ago
- Founder: Jim Moran
- Headquarters: Deerfield Beach, Florida, USA
- Area served: Southeastern United States
- Key people: Dan Chait (President and CEO); Colin Brown (Chairman of the Board)
- Products: Vehicles, Parts, Automotive Transport, Financial Services, Financial, Insurance & Warranty Products, Software, Services, Home Product Services
- Revenue: $24.7 billion (2025)
- Number of employees: 5,500 (2025)
- Subsidiaries: List: Transportation; Southeast Toyota Distributors; Southeast Toyota Parts; Southeastern Transportation Systems; Southeast Toyota Service Finance & Insurance; Southeast Toyota Finance; JM&A Group Other; Home Franchise Concepts; JM Family Holdings; Jim Moran Foundation
- Website: jmfamily.com

JM Family Enterprises, Inc. (JMFE) is a diversified automotive company, founded by Jim Moran in 1968. It is ranked by Forbes as the 13th largest privately held company in the United States. https://jmfamily.com/press-kit/jm-family-enterprises/

== History ==
Founded in 1968 by James M. (Jim) Moran, JM Family has grown from a core distribution business importing Japanese cars into a diversified automotive corporation whose principal businesses focus on vehicle distribution and processing, financial services, finance and insurance products, retail sales and dealer technology products and services. The company employs more than 5,000 associates.

Deerfield Beach became JMFE's corporate headquarters in 1981. Jacksonville architect Robert C. Broward designed the campus.

=== Best Company to work for ===
In 2016, JMFE was ranked 13th on Fortune magazine's article, "30 Best Workplaces to Retire From".

JM Family marked their 50th year in business by announcing a $150 million makeover for their corporate headquarters."

The year 2022 was the 24th year that JM Family Enterprises was included in Fortune's "100 Best Companies to Work For" list.

== Operations ==
JMFE began with a distributorship for imported Japanese vehicles and grew rapidly. The first year, cars were being sold to 42 dealerships by eleven associates in Pompano Beach, Florida.

=== New Headquarters ===
The corporate headquarters complex consisted of 15 buildings along Jim Moran Boulevard. In April 2018 JMFE announced a $150 million renovation and expansion. A new 900-car parking garage was key to the transformation into a pedestrian-centered campus with green space. Three buildings of the original buildings were not demolished and seven were demolished. New buildings included three new office buildings and a two-floor dining facility; a conference and training center (55,000-square-foot (5,100 m^{2})); and a sports complex (20,000-square-foot (1,900 m^{2})).

=== Information Technology ===
In 2004, InformationWeek magazine and CIC Research conducted a survey of large U.S. companies in 21 industries to determine the "Top Industry Performers" for innovative IT users. In the Automotive Industry, JM Family Enterprises was chosen.

A 2006 article in InformationWeek magazine discussed how JMFE transitioned from a service provider to a business partner: "Wring Profits Out Of IT". At the time, the company marketed more than two dozen IT services and products including network services, web filters, virus protection, retail kiosks and wireless products. That same year, JMFE was ranked ninth on the InformationWeek 500.

JMsolutions was formed to sell internal IT products & services outside the company. Products included JMsolutions RetailSuite and Mobile Auto Xchange, a wireless appraisal program.

=== Southeast Toyota Distributors ===
On October 26, 1968, Jim Moran entered into an agreement to distribute Toyota vehicles from the port in Jacksonville, Florida to the states of Florida, Georgia, Alabama, North and South Carolina. Southeast Toyota Distributors (SET) was founded that year.

SETs original vehicle processing center is located at the Jacksonville Port Authority (JaxPort) Talleyrand terminal and processes the vehicles that arrive by ship. As of 2022, the majority of vehicles distributed by SET arrive by Rail transport, not ship.

The Westlake Processing facility opened in 2002 on the northwest side of Jacksonville for vehicles destined for Southern Alabama, Southern Georgia and Florida.

The Inland Processing facility is located in Commerce, Georgia for vehicles intended for distribution to dealers in Northern Alabama, Northern Georgia and the Carolinas.

Southeast Toyota Parts operates from a single, 410,000-square-foot (38,000 m^{2}) warehouse in Jacksonville, the size of 8 football fields. For 2020, $437 million in Toyota parts & accessories were sold.

Southeast Transportation Systems (STS) at the Westlake Processing center employs drivers and tractor/trailers who transport vehicles to Southeast Toyota dealers and fleet customers from SET's Jacksonville and Commerce vehicle processing facilities.

The Technical Training Center (TTC) opened in 2007 at the Westlake Processing center in Jacksonville for dealership employees.

=== Southeast Toyota Finance ===
World Omni Financial Corporation (WOFCO), d/b/a Southeast Toyota Finance (SETF) is a captive & diversified financial services company which finances nearly half of the new Toyota vehicles sold by SET's 177 dealers. They have customer care centers in Mobile, Alabama and St. Louis, Missouri. SETF also provides $780 million in floorplan financing to those same dealers.

=== JM&A Group ===
JM&A Group provides finance, insurance and warranty products for sale by any automotive dealer. The training center is a new, 55,000-square-foot (5,100 m^{2}) facility on their corporate campus in Deerfield Beach.

=== Home Franchise Concepts ===
JMFE purchased Irvine, California-based Home Franchise Concepts from Trilantic North America in 2019. Home Franchise Concepts provides franchise opportunities for homeowner products and services supported by training and marketing using a proven business model.

=== Futura Title & Escrow ===
JMFE purchased Boise, Idaho-based Futura Title & Escrow from Seidler Equity Partners in 2022. Futura Title & Escrow is the largest family of independent title and escrow companies in the Pacific Northwest. With more than 70 branch operations serving 60-plus counties throughout Idaho and Oregon, and parts of Montana, Washington, and Wyoming.

== Jim Moran Foundation ==
In 2000, Moran established the Jim Moran Foundation In 2015, the foundation made a $100 million donation to Florida State University to create the Jim Moran School of Entrepreneurship in Tallahassee. The gift is believed to be the largest single contribution to Florida's higher education system.
