= Jim Moran (businessman) =

American businessman (1918–2007)

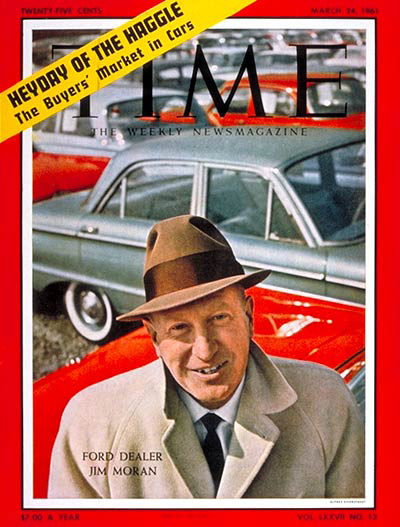
- Moran on the cover of Time (1961)
- Born: James Martin Moran; August 8, 1918; Chicago, Illinois, U.S.
- Died: April 24, 2007 (aged 88); Hillsboro Beach, Florida, U.S.
- Occupations: Businessman; philanthropist; yachtsman
- Spouses: Arline Steveley (m. 1941; died 1976) Jan Kline (m. 1976)

James Martin Moran (August 8, 1918 – April 24, 2007) was an American car dealer and philanthropist whose net worth of $2.4 billion ranked him 390th on the Forbes 400 at the time of his death.

== Early years ==
=== Personal ===
Moran was born in Chicago. His father died when he was 14, but his mother insisted he stay in school. He graduated from Loyola High School (now Loyola Academy) in 1936. Moran married Arline Steveley in 1941, then served in the U.S. Army from 1942 to 1943. He and his wife had three children: Arline in 1943, Pat in 1945 and Jim Jr. in 1948. His first wife died from complications of rheumatoid arthritis in February, 1976. Moran married Janice Maxine Kline on July 30, 1976.

=== Business ===
Following high school, he saved his money and bought a Sinclair gas station in 1939 for $360; returning to Chicago after his war service, he added a used-car lot, then opened a Hudson dealership, Midtown Motors in 1946 which grew to be the largest in the U.S. When Hudson merged with Nash-Kelvinator, he switched brands to Ford in 1955, renaming it Courtesy Ford. As the first car dealer to advertise on television, he became well known in the Chicago area as "Jim Moran the Courtesy Man." In an interview with Mike Downey in the Chicago Tribune on Oct. 21, 2005 as the World Series got underway, Moran recalled his 1959 promotion to give a free car to any Sox player who hit a home run in the 1959 World Series. (He ended up giving three 1960 Ford Falcons to slugger Ted Kluszewski.) By the late 1950s, Courtesy Ford had become the world's largest Ford dealer with millions of dollars in sales. On March 24, 1961, he was the first and only automobile dealer to appear on the cover of Time Magazine, until 2021 when Elon Musk was named Time Person of the year.

== Retiring to Florida ==
In the early 1960s, he was diagnosed with terminal cancer and given six months to live. He and his wife Arline, who was also ill, decided to move to Florida. However, his disease went into remission and in 1968, he returned to the automotive field by opening a Pontiac dealership in Homestead, which he subsequently moved to Hollywood. Moran turned it into the world's biggest Pontiac dealership and it remained #1 in sales through 1990. Moran decided to sell it in order to focus on the Toyota business, but it was sold in 1994 to the Craig Zinn Automotive Group, the first company to acquire a Toyota dealership in Florida.

== Southeast Toyota Distributors ==
In early 1968, he was contacted by a friend from Chicago who said that Toyota wanted to establish a dealer network in the Southeast U.S. and wanted to talk to Jim Moran, who asked what a Toyota was. The company had been unsuccessful at breaking into the American market at the end of the 1950s and was trying again. Moran declined, but his friend was insistent that Moran drive one. According to Moran, he tested everything to see if it would break. While cruising at 55 mph on the interstate, Moran shifted into reverse, and the engine and transmission survived. Moran concluded that although Toyotas weren't as stylish or comfortable as domestic vehicles, they were well-built, reasonably priced, and destined to change the automotive business. On October 26, 1968, he entered into an agreement to distribute Toyota vehicles from the port in Jacksonville, Florida, to the states of Florida, Georgia, Alabama, North and South Carolina. His Southeast Toyota Distributors (SET) was founded that year and in 2006, distributed over 400,000 vehicles, 20% of all new Toyotas sold in the United States.

== JM Family Enterprises ==
Moran created other automotive businesses under the JM Family Enterprises (JMFE) umbrella, which is headquartered in Deerfield Beach, Florida. JMFE is recognized as one of Fortune's "100 Best Places to Work in America" and the second largest private company in Florida. The company grew from a distribution business into a diversified automotive corporation. Today, those businesses also include vehicle processing, financial services and insurance products, retail sales/dealer technology products and services. JMFE is an industry leader with 2021 sales of $16.0 billion and employing approximately 4,500 associates nationwide.

== Troubles ==
Moran pleaded guilty to tax evasion in 1984. He insisted that he had been given bad advice and it was not intentional. He was fined $35,000, put on probation, and created a training facility for disadvantaged youth (see Philanthropy, below).

A number of Toyota dealers filed suit against JMFE alleging that they were coerced into doing business with other JMFE companies in order to receive the most desirable Toyota models. Eventually, all the lawsuits were dropped after a settlement was reached.

In the late 1980s, SET was accused of denying dealership franchises to blacks who met the distributor's requirements. In 1992, a congressional hearing was held to investigate possible discrimination. In response, JMFE began the yearly African-American Achievers Awards.

== Yachting ==
Moran's first boat was purchased in the 1940s; a 19-foot Chris-Craft. From that point, he was hooked. Boats and entertaining on them was Jim Moran's passion. In his lifetime, he owned more than 200, including models from Burger, Wellcraft Scarab, Hatteras, Sea Ray, Rybovich and multimillion-dollar motor yachts from Feadship. In 1983, he asked Feadship to design a boat large enough to be seaworthy for ocean cruising but elegant for entertaining business associates. Over the next 20+ years, Moran commissioned seven more vessels from the company, culminating in the 168' Gallant Lady in 2002.

His modus operandi was to commission a yacht, take delivery (boats usually took 18–24 months to build), use it for a couple of years, then commission a new yacht with improvements. When the new boat was finished, he would sell the old boat at a profit and repeat the cycle.

Jim Moran had a significant influence on yachting. ShowBoats International presented him with their first Flagship Award in 2006. It was awarded because "he progressively pushed the envelope on technology and innovation...generously shared his yachting experience with his employees and charitable organizations...plus his life-time commitment to stewardship of the environment"

The Yacht Club of Monaco and sponsor, Hublot presented him with the Yachting Heritage Award for "innovation in yacht design and technology with a commitment to ocean preservation".

Jim Moran and his wife Jan were founding members of the International SeaKeepers Society, who renamed their calibration lab and engineering office in Moran's honor after his death. They were also included in the two-star Admiral's Club.

Mr. Moran was posthumously honored on April 18, 2008, in Venice, Italy with a special Superyacht Legacy Award from Boat International that recognized his contributions to yacht design, ocean conservation efforts, boating enthusiasm and philanthropy.

== Philanthropy ==
=== Youth Automotive Training Center ===
In 1984, Moran founded the Youth Automotive Training Center (YATC), located in Deerfield Beach, Florida as a privately funded program that offers basic automotive repair training, GED and academic preparation, and life skills proficiency for at-risk young people. In 2010, the number of graduates surpassed 500, living as successful, law-abiding citizens because they were given an opportunity to learn a marketable skill.

=== Jim Moran Heart and Vascular Center ===
After open heart surgery saved his life in 1988, Moran donated $1 million to fund a cardiovascular intensive care unit at Holy Cross Hospital in Fort Lauderdale. The Morans and JM Family Enterprises gave a combined $6 million in 2000 to build the Jim Moran Heart and Vascular Center. His last donation was a five-year, $26 million Moran Challenge for the Jim Moran Heart and Vascular Research Institute, that began in 2006.

=== Jim Moran Institute for Global Entrepreneurship ===
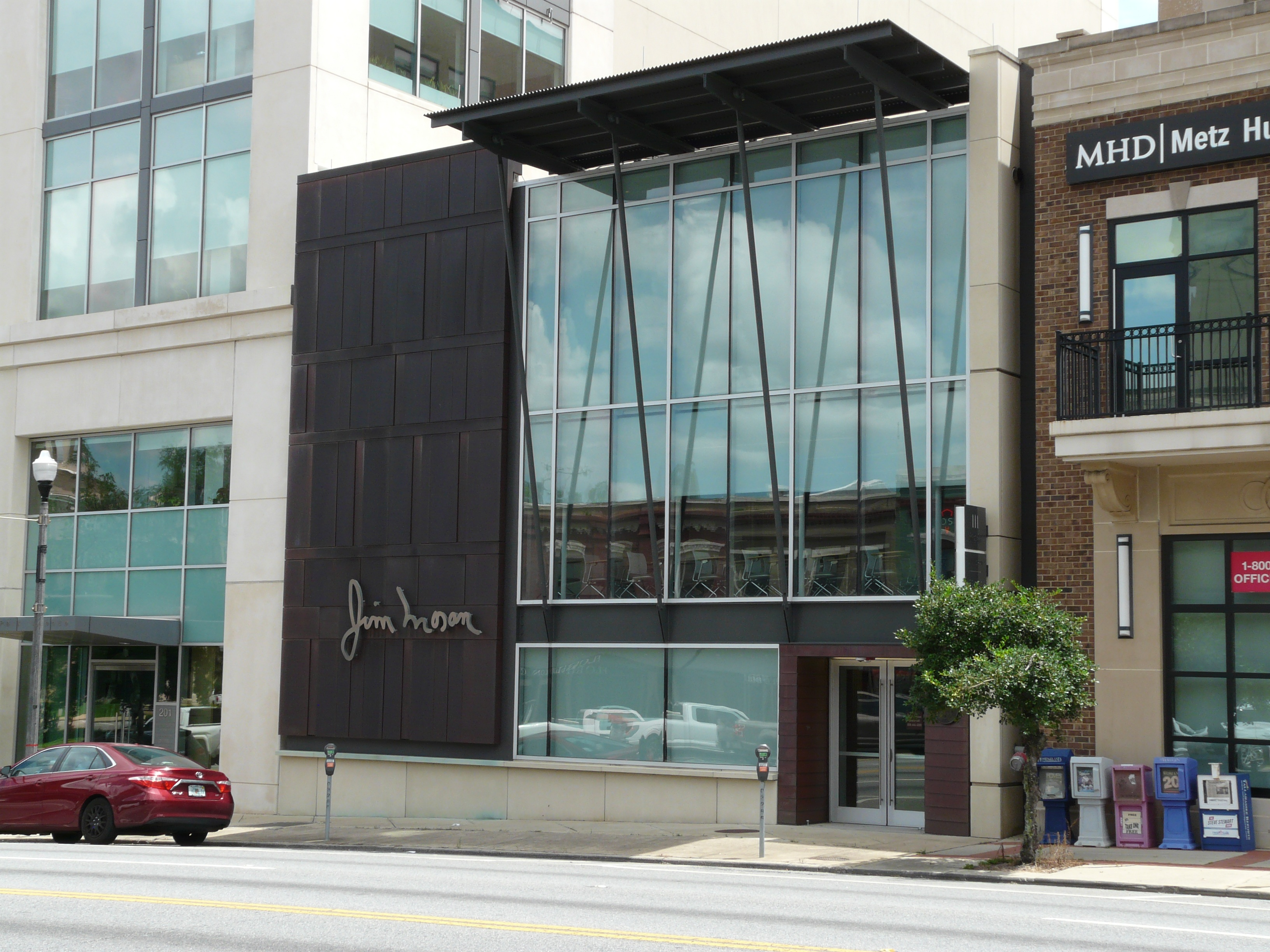
The Jim Moran Institute for Global Entrepreneurship in downtown Tallahassee, Florida

The Jim Moran Institute for Global Entrepreneurship was established in 1995 at Florida State University through a $1.8 million gift. The purpose of the entity was to provide a wide range of services to the entrepreneur at no charge. In 2015, the Jim Moran Foundation donated another $100 million to Florida State University - the school's largest donation in history- to create the nation's largest interdisciplinary, degree-granting school of entrepreneurship, today known as the Jim Moran College of Entrepreneurship. A significant portion of the gift will continue to fund the Jim Moran Institute for Global Entrepreneurship, which has a long, 20-year history of serving entrepreneurs and small businesses throughout Florida. The Jim Moran Institute is housed in the Jim Moran College of Entrepreneurship and continues its extensive outreach mission to help bridge real-world entrepreneurship practice with entrepreneurship education provided through the new school.

=== Jacksonville Gift ===
The Times-Union Center for the Performing Arts in Jacksonville, Florida, was the recipient of a $2 million Moran donation in 1996 which funded a complete renovation of what was the original Civic Auditorium, which was transformed into a showplace with new balconies, a complete reconfiguration of seating, new ceiling and state-of-the-art sound system. Equipped for Broadway touring shows, with a seating capacity of 3,000, this theater gives residents a venue to see classic Broadway productions. It was named the Jim and Jan Moran Theater.

=== Jim Moran Foundation ===
In 2000, he established The Jim Moran Foundation with the mission to improve the quality of life for the youth and families of Florida through the support of innovative programs and opportunities that meet the ever-changing needs of the community. JM Family Enterprises continues to provide funding for the entity. In 2015 the foundation made a $100 million donation to Florida State University to create the Jim Moran School of Entrepreneurship in downtown Tallahassee. Early estimates for the completion date is August, 2018.

In December 2015, the Jim Moran Foundation gave what is believed to be the largest single contribution ever in Florida's higher education system - a $100 million donation to Florida State University.

== Honors ==
Moran was the recipient of the prestigious Horatio Alger Award in 1996. At the urging of friends and business associates, he published his autobiography that same year: Jim Moran: the Courtesy Man. It was subtitled, "Inside the Heart of One of the Most Successful Marketers in the Automobile Industry". The following year, Florida State University awarded him a Doctor of Humane Letters in recognition of his marketing talent and skills. The International Automotive Hall of Fame inducted Moran in 2005.

== Death ==
On April 24, 2007, Moran died at his home in Hillsboro Beach, Florida, at the age of 88 on the very day it was announced that Toyota had surpassed General Motors as the best-selling automaker in the world. His wife Jan has continued his philanthropic endeavors through the Jim Moran Foundation.
