= 35.5 cm MRK L/22.5 =

1875 rifled breech loader gun by Krupp

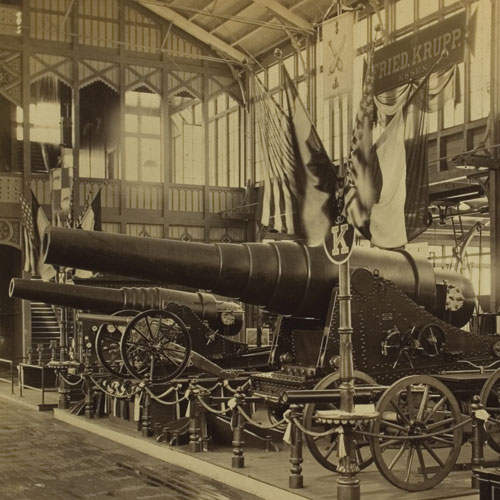
- The 35.5 cm MRK L/22.5 at the 1876 Centennial Exhibition in Philadelphia
- Type: Naval artillery; Coastal artillery
- Place of origin: Germany

Service history
- Used by: Turkey Russia

Production history
- Designer: Krupp
- Manufacturer: Krupp
- Produced: 1875
- No. built: 2

Specifications
- Mass: 57,500 kg
- Length: 8,000 mm (L/22.5)
- Caliber: 355 mm
- Breech: horizontal sliding wedge
- Muzzle velocity: 500 m/s

The 35.5 cm Mantel Ring Kanone L/22.5 was a 35.5 cm 22.5 caliber long Krupp Mantel Ring Kanone (MRK). It was a rifled breech loader built-up gun with a Krupp cylindroprismatic sliding breech. It was exhibited at the 1876 Centennial Exposition and then bought by Russia. Meanwhile, another gun was sent to Turkey, which made it part of the Fortifications of the Dardanelles.

== Context ==
=== The race between armor and guns ===
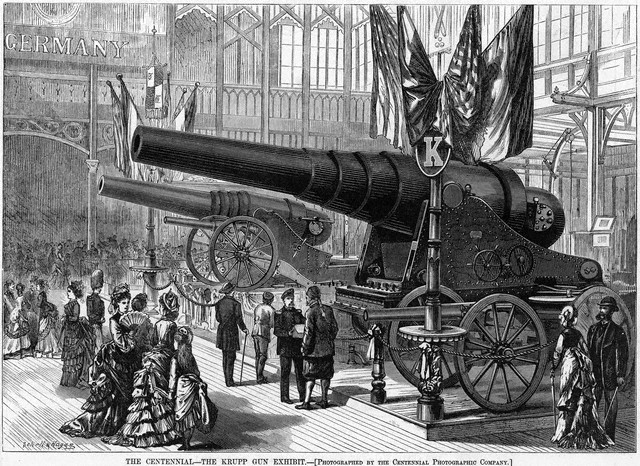
Engraving after a photo taken in Philadelphia

During the 1860s, there was a continuous increase in the armor protection of ships. If the gun manufacturers kept up with this increase by a step by step increase in the caliber of their guns, this would naturally lead to an enormous collection of only slightly different guns doing more or less the same thing. In time, this would result in a lot of waste. The North German Federal Navy therefore wanted to have a caliber system with only a few calibers.

In 1869 it was decided that the coastal artillery of Prussia would have built-up guns (Ring Kanone) of: 15, 21, and 28 cm caliber. For the on board artillery, the question was complicated by ship sizes. Its heavy calibers would be: 15, 17, 21, 24 and 26 cm. In early 1873, the German Navy concluded that its coastal 28 cm RK L/22 gun would not be strong enough in the near future.

=== Krupp enters the gun market ===
Krupp was known for its capability to produce a type of crucible steel that, at the time, was of superior quality. Krupp then wanted to use this steel to make cannons. This met with quite some resistance, because these were traditionally made of cast iron or bronze. Krupp got its first major order for breech loading field guns in 1859. Krupp then wanted to expand its breech loading system to heavier calibers, but here it faced the competition of the Elswick Ordnance Company and others.

In 1868, Krupp tried to convince the North German Federal Navy to buy its 15, 21, and 24 cm caliber breechloader guns. In comparative trials of Krupp's 24 cm K L/20 against Elswick's RML 9-inch Armstrong Gun, the British muzzleloader proved superior at first. After Krupp was allowed to use a new type of gunpowder, it established the superiority of its gun over the Armstrong gun. The trials also put an end to the idea that breechloading was not suitable for heavy guns.

=== Marketing ===
Selling a product in a business to business market involves establishing relations with customers and convincing them that it is in their interest to buy your product. Krupp used all kinds of techniques to market its products. One of these was its presence at World's fairs. At the 1851 Great Exhibition in London, Krupp primarily showed its railway and other cast steel products. It also showed a 6-pounder muzzle-loading field gun and a cast steel ingot of 2,000 kg. The latter indicated an upper limit to the weight of Krupp guns which were made from a single cast.

In Paris Krupp was present at the Exposition Universelle (1855). It then showed a 5,000 kg ingot, different types of machinery, and a 12-pdr shell gun. It led to the French and other militaries ordering some guns to the test the Krupp product. At the 1862 International Exhibition in London, Krupp then exhibited a cast steel ingot of 20,000 kg and proved itself to be the foremost producer of crucible steel.

Krupp's presence at World's fairs was useful to establish relations. Many fairs where visited by military delegations, but also by higher authorities who would otherwise not see the Krupp products. The world's fairs also generated a lot of publicity for the company. This could be increased by showing masterpieces like: the biggest gun, the biggest steel ingot, etc. An example of this strategy was the 35.5 cm (1000-pdr) gun exhibited at the Exposition Universelle (1867). This gun weighed c. 50,000 kg and was built-up. The inner tube weighed 20,000 kg while the rings added another 30,000 kg. Other marketing techniques that Krupp used were sending gifts and inviting (military) authorities to study trips to Essen and the company's shooting grounds.

=== The successor to the 28 cm RK ===
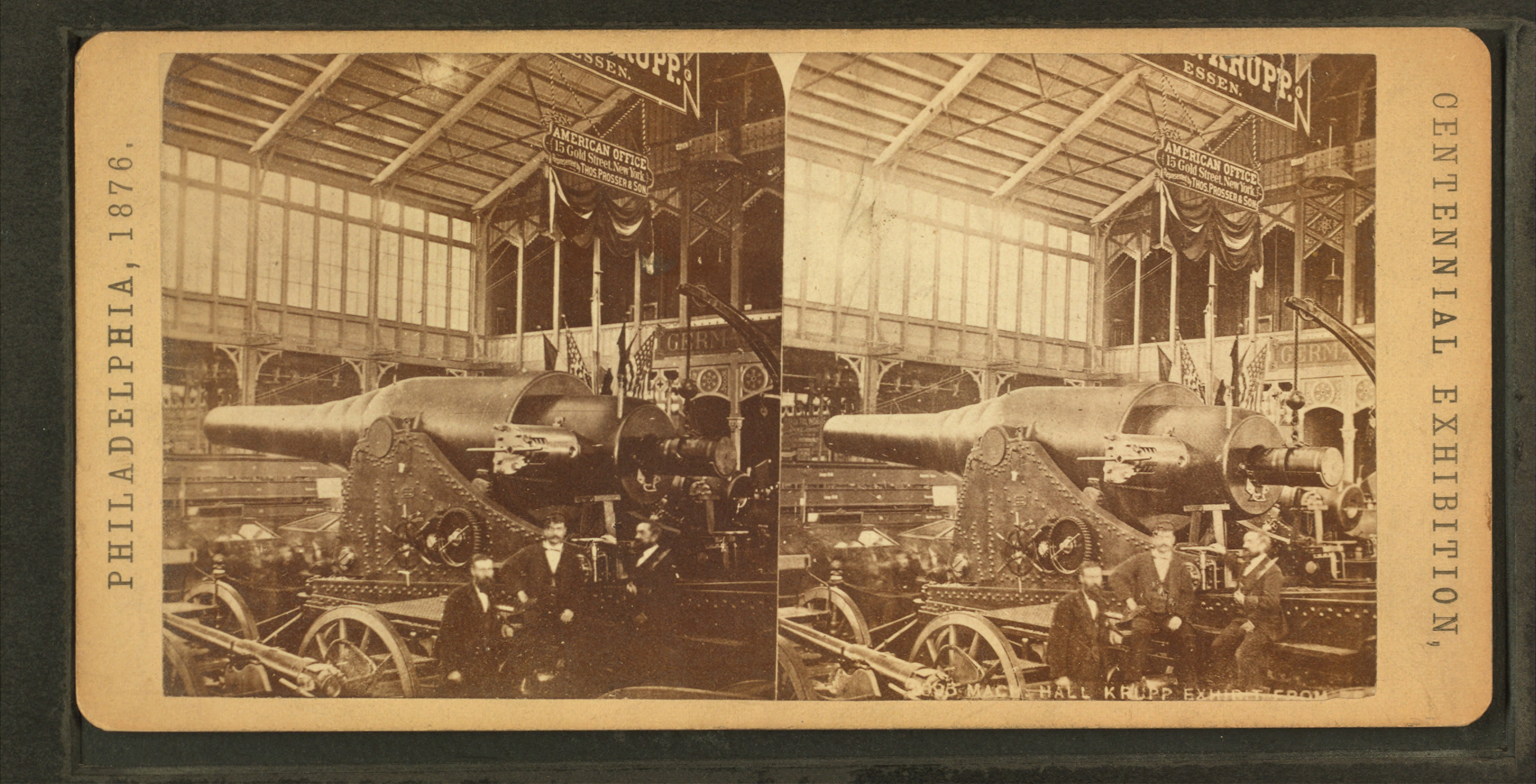
Philadelphia Exposition photo

As mentioned above, in early 1873, the German Navy had concluded that its coastal 28 cm RK L/22 would not be powerful enough in the near future. It was not known what the caliber of the successor of the 28 cm RK L/22 had to be. Krupp had anticipated on this demand by producing the 30.5 cm RK L/22 in 1872. This gun was exhibited at the 1873 Vienna World's Fair. In 1874 Germany ordered three 30.5 cm RK L/22. It tested these in 1875, but the decision to buy a 30.5 cm gun (the 30.5 cm MRK L/22) would only be taken in 1876.

1875 was a difficult year for Krupp. Meanwhile, the developments in armor and guns continued unabated. It was quite possible that the German Navy would not choose the 30.5 cm, and then Krupp would need to have an alternative. Krupp anticipated on the demand for an even stronger gun than the 30.5 cm by producing the first 35.5 cm Mantel Ring Kanone L/22.5 in 1875. At long ranges, 35.5 cm was designed to penetrate the 14 inch armor belts that were already in use on some ships. On a range of up to 500 m it was designed to be able to penetrate a 16-inch armor belt supported by a teak layer like that of HMS Bellerophon.

In February 1876 some details came out about the gun. In a preliminary test, the 35.5 cm MRK L/22.5 fired a 520 kg projectile by using a charge of 135 kg of prismatic gunpowder, propelling the shot to a velocity of 500 m/s. The result showed that the gun would be able to penetrate the iron belt of HMS Inflexible at up to 1,800 m. 14-inch belts would be penetrated at all distances.

=== Competition between Krupp and Armstrong ===
The British Royal Navy also had to deal with increased armor protection. Its Royal Arsenal at Woolwich designed the RML 16-inch 80-ton gun in 1874, and test-fired it on 17 September 1876. At first, the 35.5 cm MRK L/22.5 of 57,500 kg proved somewhat (2.5%) more powerful than this British 15.75 inch (40 cm) caliber muzzleloading gun of 81 ton, which weighed much more. The British reacted by increasing the caliber of the 81 ton gun to 16 inch, yielding a gun that was somewhat more powerful than the much lighter Krupp 35.5 cm.

== Service ==
=== Two guns ===
At first, many thought that only a single 35.5 cm gun had been made, the one for the Philadelphia exposition. It was only after some confusion, that it became clear that Krupp had made two guns: One for Philadelphia, and one for the Ottoman Empire.

=== The Centennial Exposition in Philadelphia ===
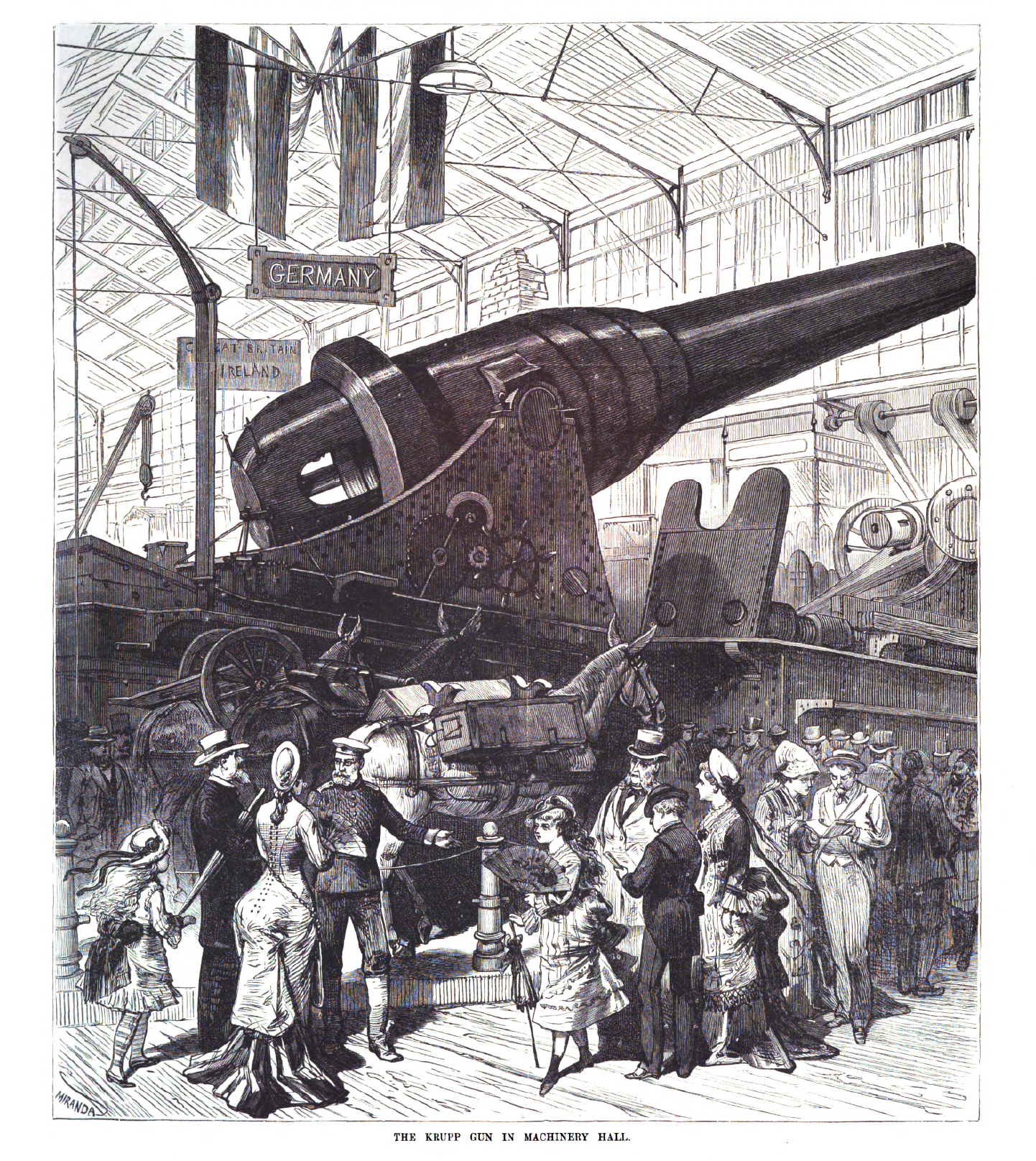
Dramatized engraving in Leslie's journal

On 27 December 1875, the giant gun (Riesen Geschütz) that Krupp wanted to send to the Philadelphia exposition was reported to be ready. By then details like the weight and length were known, but details about the charge and shot were inaccurate. On 4 March 1876, the gun meant for Philadelphia passed the railway station of Münster on its way to Bremen, from whence it would proceed to Philadelphia. On 23 April 1876 the 35.5 cm gun, the other Krupp exhibits, and other goods arrived in Philadelphia on board the Krupp freighter Essen.

At the 1876 Centennial Exposition in Philadelphia, the 35.5 cm MRK L/22.5 was the showpiece (Hauptstück) of the Krupp exhibition. By its visual impact alone, it drew a lot of attention to the German part of the exhibition. However, the list of items in the Krupp exhibit had 37 civilian (mainly railway) items and only 9 artillery items. To further put this into perspective: In one 46 lines long description of the Machinery hall, the gun got less than one line and was simply mentioned as: 'the 1200-pounder breach-loading Krupp cannon'. In another description, the gun got much more attention, but this was only on par with other exhibits.

In images of the gun at the exposition, there seems to be quite a difference between the photographs and the printed engravings. The photographs show the gun with the barrel only slightly elevated. On those photos that also depict people, one can see that the relation between the length of the people and the height of the trunnions, which should be at 2,670 m above the ground makes sense. Looking at images, some seem to have been made by accurately following a photo, and then putting the people in. See e.g. 'Engraving after a photo taken in Philadelphia', which seems somewhat credible. Other images, like the one published in Frank Leslie's Illustrated Newspaper are clearly dramatized. The trunnions now seem to be about 4 m above the ground and the gun barrel is depicted at an elevation that was probably higher than the 18.75 degrees that were possible.

=== To Russia ===
In early February 1877 it became known that the Philadelphia gun had been acquired by Russia. The freighter Essen first brought it to Bremen. After picking up some more guns there, she set sail to Kronstadt (near Saint Petersburg). In May 1877, the freighter stranded near Filsand (Vilsandi) / Ösel (Saaremaa).

Essen was a steam freighter of 925 GRT built in Kiel in 1874 and owned by Krupp. Her regular work was to transfer ores from Spain to Germany. On 3 March 1881 she left Bilbao for Rotterdam under skipper J.P. Jörgensen. The weather was very foggy, and this continued in English Channel. In the night of 5 to 6 March she then stranded again and was wrecked about one mile from St Catherine's Lighthouse on the Isle of Wight.

The Russian gun was mentioned in an overview of Russian coastal artillery. The given designation was 14-inch short steel R.B.L. gun pattern 1877. Further details given were the 80 grooves and the weight of nearly 58 tons.

=== Turkish service ===
Ever since 1863, the Ottoman Empire headed by sultan Abdulaziz since 1861, was a major buyer of Krupp artillery. At first this was primarily field artillery, but in 1873 the empire also ordered 380 guns of 15–28 cm caliber. The main goal of this huge order was the defence of the Bosporus and the Dardanelles, where the guns of the empire's old fortresses would be replaced by modern artillery. It all meant that the Ottoman Empire would also feel the need to acquire a gun heavier than the 28 cm L/22 that it had.

In February 1876, there were reports that the new 35.5 cm had been made on orders of the Turkish government. On 20 February 1876 a Krupp train with the 35.5 cm gun meant for Turkey passed the Osnabrück station of the Venlo-Hamburg railway. In early April 1876, this gun arrived in Istanbul. On 6 April it had been placed on Tophane square, where the sultan would visit it.

By the time that the Turkish gun arrived in Istanbul, it was known that Krupp had gifted the gun to the sultan. In exchange, the sultan had gifted all kinds of jewelry for a total worth of about 400,000 Mark. This more or less equalled the worth of the gun. This occurred before the 30 May 1876 Ottoman coup d'état which deposed Abdulaziz.

The Gun was destined for the Dardanelles fortress Tschanak Kalessi also known as Sultanieh at Çanakkale. Here the gun was placed in a big redan.

== Characteristics ==
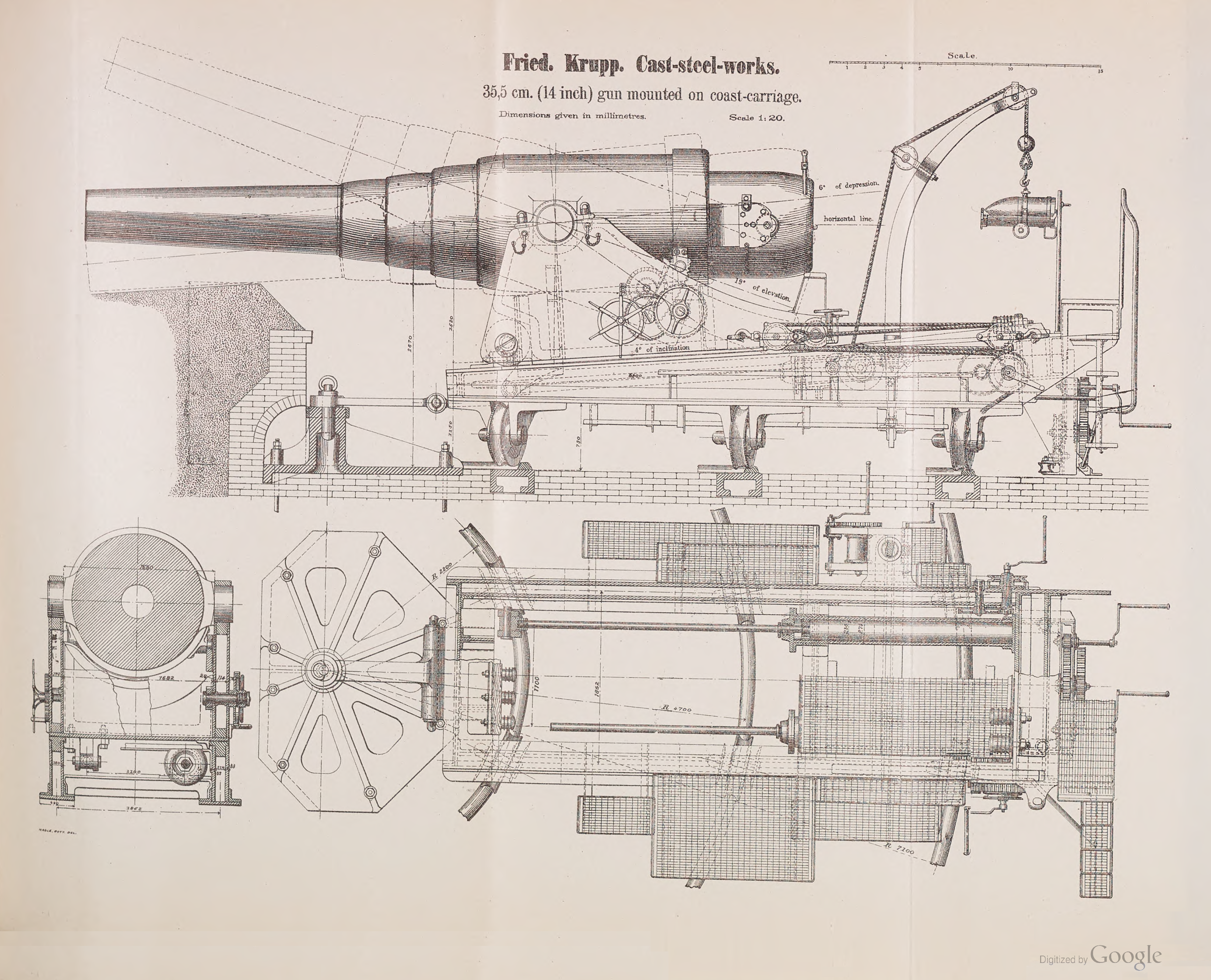
On coast carriage

In early 1876 a report was published about the 35.5 cm MRK L/22.5. This had details about the gun as it was tested in Germany on 27 December 1875. The report contained the following information:

The barrel was of the new Mantel Ring Kanone typ (jacketed and hooped). The caliber was exactly 355 mm. The barrel was 8 m long (L/22.5) with a length of bore of 6.865 m (L/19.3). It had 80 grooves of 2 mm depth. The lands were 4.5 mm wide. The constant twist length was 16 m or L/45. The barrel weighed 57,500 kg.

The gun stood on a coastal carriage with a firing height of 2,670 m. This allowed elevation to 18.75 degrees and declination to minus 7 degrees. The lower frame of the carriage has two hydraulic brakes to dampen recoil. These brakes each had a cylinder filled with 84 liters of glycerol. The total weight of the carriage and accessories was 34,000 kg.

The projectiles of the gun were 2.8 calibers long. These had copper driving bands. The steel grenade weighed 510 kg, including 15 kg of explosives. The hardened cast iron grenade weighed 525 kg, including 8 kg of explosives. The long grenade weighed 410 kg including 30 kg of explosives. The prismatic pulver used at the time had a density of 1.73-1.76.

During the December 1875 tests, the steel and hardened iron grenades were fired with 125 kg of gunpowder, the long grenade with 110 kg. The steel grenade reached an average velocity of 475 m/s, the hardened iron grenade reached 470 m/s and the long grenade 405 m/s. However, when a charge of 135 kg was used, the grenade indeed attained the velocity of 500 (497.1) m/s.

== Further development ==
The 35.5 cm L/22.5 was one of Krupp's last attempts to produce more effective artillery by simply increasing the caliber of its guns. Increasing the length of the guns and (somewhat later) the projectiles was the way forward. On 2 July 1878 Krupp test-fired two 25 caliber long heavy guns in the presence of many military delegations. These were the 35.5 cm MRK L/25 and the 30.5 cm MRK L/25.

The new 35.5 cm MRK L/25 was much more than simply a longer version of the L/22.5 gun. The new gun was 8.8 m long, but weighed only 52t. Even its carriage was somewhat lighter. With a charge of only 115 kg its shot reached a velocity of about 500 m/s.
