= 30.5 cm MRK L/35 =

30.5 cm 35 calibre long Krupp gun

30.5 cm Mantel Ring Kanone L/35
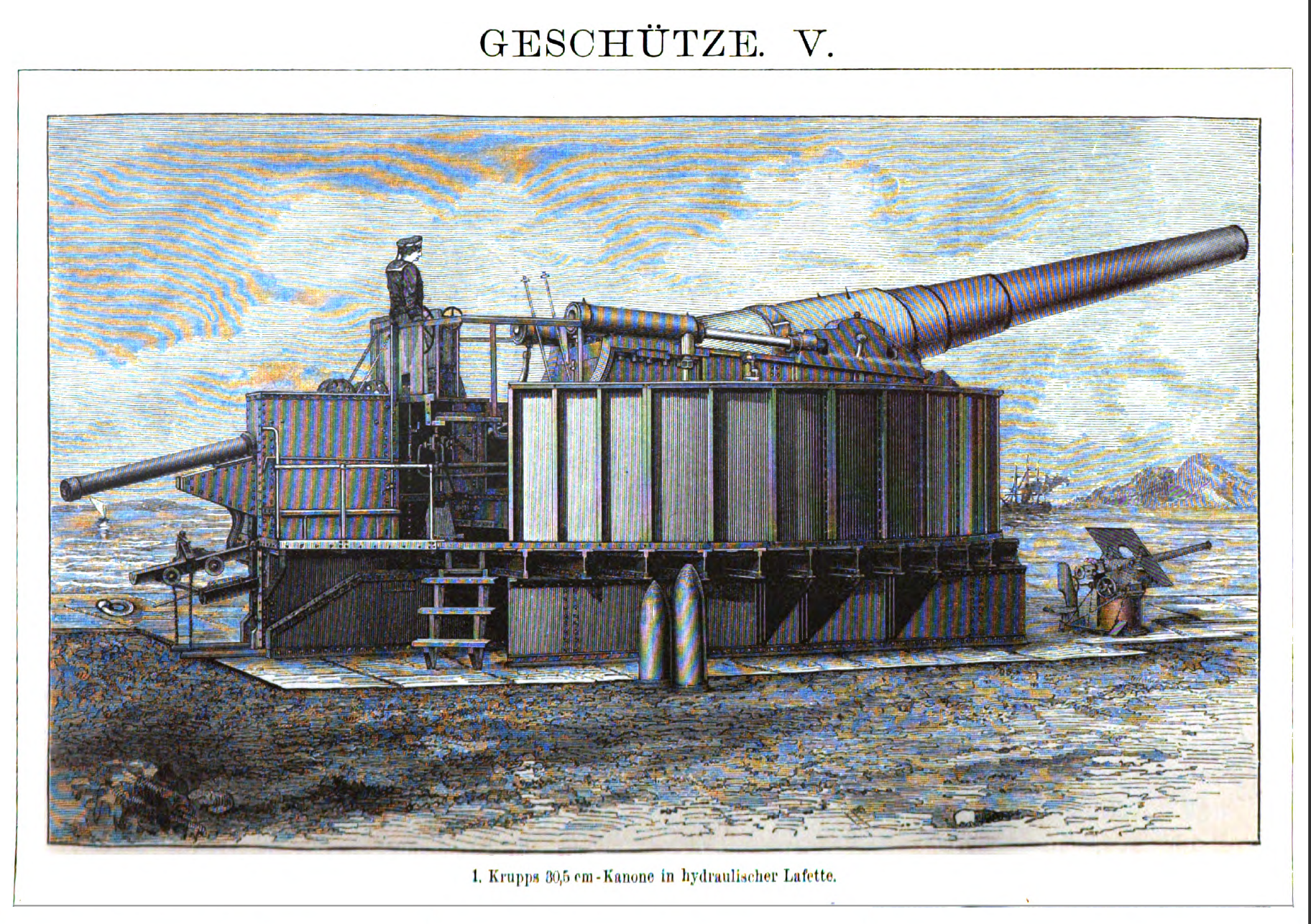
- 30.5 cm MRK L/35 gun on hydraulic carriage
- Type: Coastal Artillery
- Place of origin: Germany

Service history
- Used by: Spain

Production history
- Designer: Krupp
- Manufacturer: Krupp

Specifications
- Mass: 1882: 49,700 kg; 1887: 62,450 kg
- Length: 10.7 m (L/35)
- Caliber: 305 mm
- Breech: horizontal sliding wedge
- Muzzle velocity: 1882: 525 m/s; 1891: 610 m/s; 1893: 681 m/s

The 30.5 cm Mantel Ring Kanone L/35 was a 30.5 cm 35 caliber long Krupp gun. It was a further development of the earlier 30.5 cm MRK L/22. There were multiple models: The early model was basically a lengthened 30.5 cm MRK L/22. The later model had a heavier barrel and used a heavier charge for a higher muzzle velocity.

== Context ==
In the early 1860s, the first ironclad warships appeared. This soon led to a race between armor and armament. One of the first reactions to the increases in armor protection was to increase the caliber. At the Krupp steelworks, this led to expanding the Ring Kanonen system with the 30.5 cm RK L/22 and the 35.5 cm MRK L/22.5 coastal gun.

The change from the Ring Kanone construction to the stronger barrels of the Mantel Ring Kanone started in 1875. It led to the 30.5 cm MRK L/22, which was problematic at first. In particular, the average gas pressure inside the barrel was too high at 3,200-3,400 Atm. This average was dangerously close to the maximum pressure of 3,500 Atm that Krupp thought admissible for this gun.

== Development ==
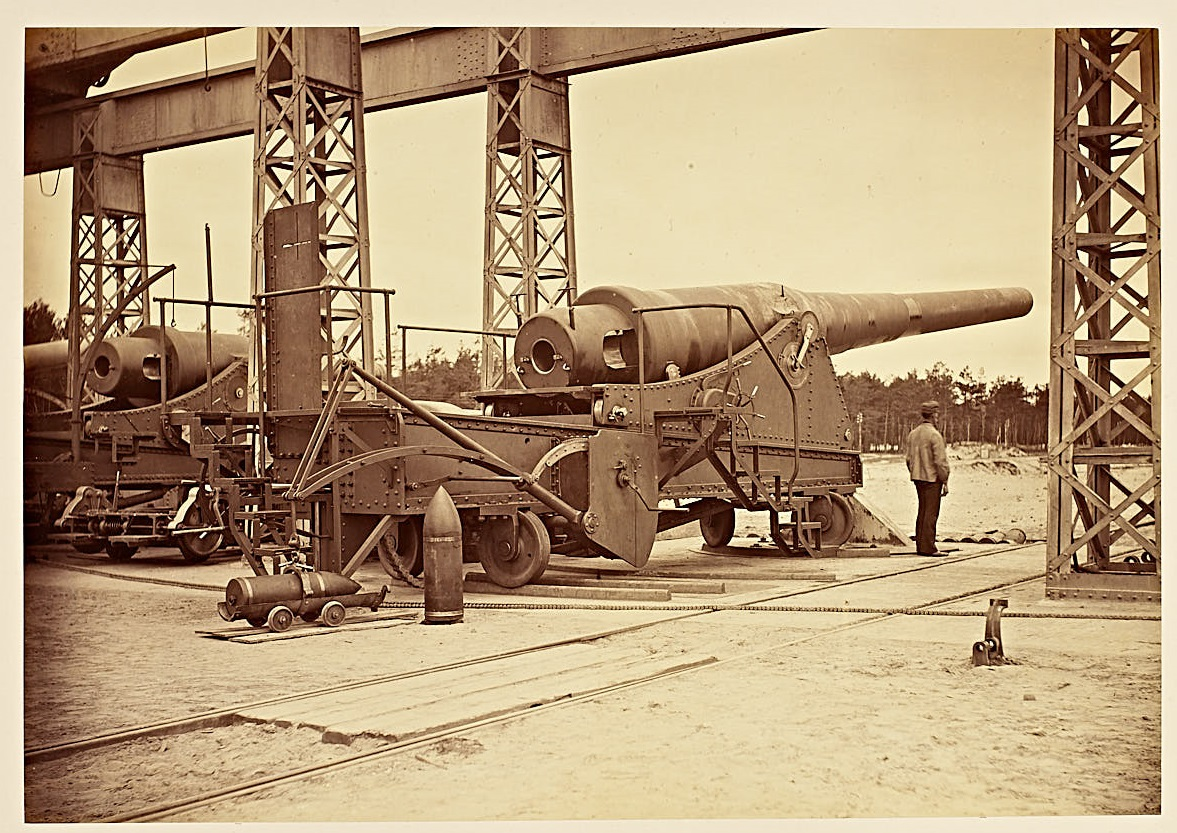
30.5 cm MRK L/35 in Meppen 1884

When it became clear that further increases in caliber were not a good option to keep up with increasing armor protection, producers began to look for ways to increase the velocity of the projectiles that were fired. Of course they first thought about changing the existing gun models. In general, the obvious option would be to increase the charge, but this was generally not possible, because barrels were designed to withstand a certain maximum charge. Other ideas to use more gunpowder centered on using slower burning gunpowder. This led to a lower peak pressure, because not all of the charge exploded simultaneously. However, this often led to unexploded gunpowder leaving the barrel and actually slowing the projectile. The conclusion was that the existing gun models could not be adapted.

Krupp then began to apply copper driving bands, a rifled projectile chamber, slower burning gunpowder, relatively longer guns, and the use heavier (longer) projectiles.

The results of these steps became visible in 1878, when a 30.5 cm MRK L/25 was tested alongside the 35.5 cm MRK L/25, a 28 cm MRK L/22 and the 15 cm MRK L/26. The results were a big step forward. The limited increase of velocity of only about 15 m/s between the 30.5 cm MRK L/22 tested in 1877 and the 30.5 cm L/25 showed that the limited increase in length was only one of the ingredients of this success.

In August 1879, the 40 cm MRK L/25 appeared alongside the 35.5 cm MRK L/25 in Meppen while the 30.5 cm caliber was absent. Smaller guns that were tested were the prototype 24 cm MRK L/25.5, and the 15 cm MRK L/28. These had an enlarged chamber that was clearly wider than the barrel and allowed a much higher charge. The 24 cm MRK L/25.5 then surprised observers by smashing through 51 cm of wrought iron armor. These results were so positive that Krupp began to plan for guns of 30 and 35 calibers length.

Already in 1880 the calculations for new Mantel Ring Kanone of 15, 21, 24, 30.5, and 40 cm caliber and a length of 30 or 35 caliber were published. The designed 30.5 cm L/35 would get a caliber of 305 mm, a length of bore of 9,770 mm, and a weight of 48,400 kg. The intended steel grenade would weigh 329 kg, and was to be fired by a charge of 132 kg for an intended velocity of 605 m/s.

== Characteristics ==
=== In 1882 ===
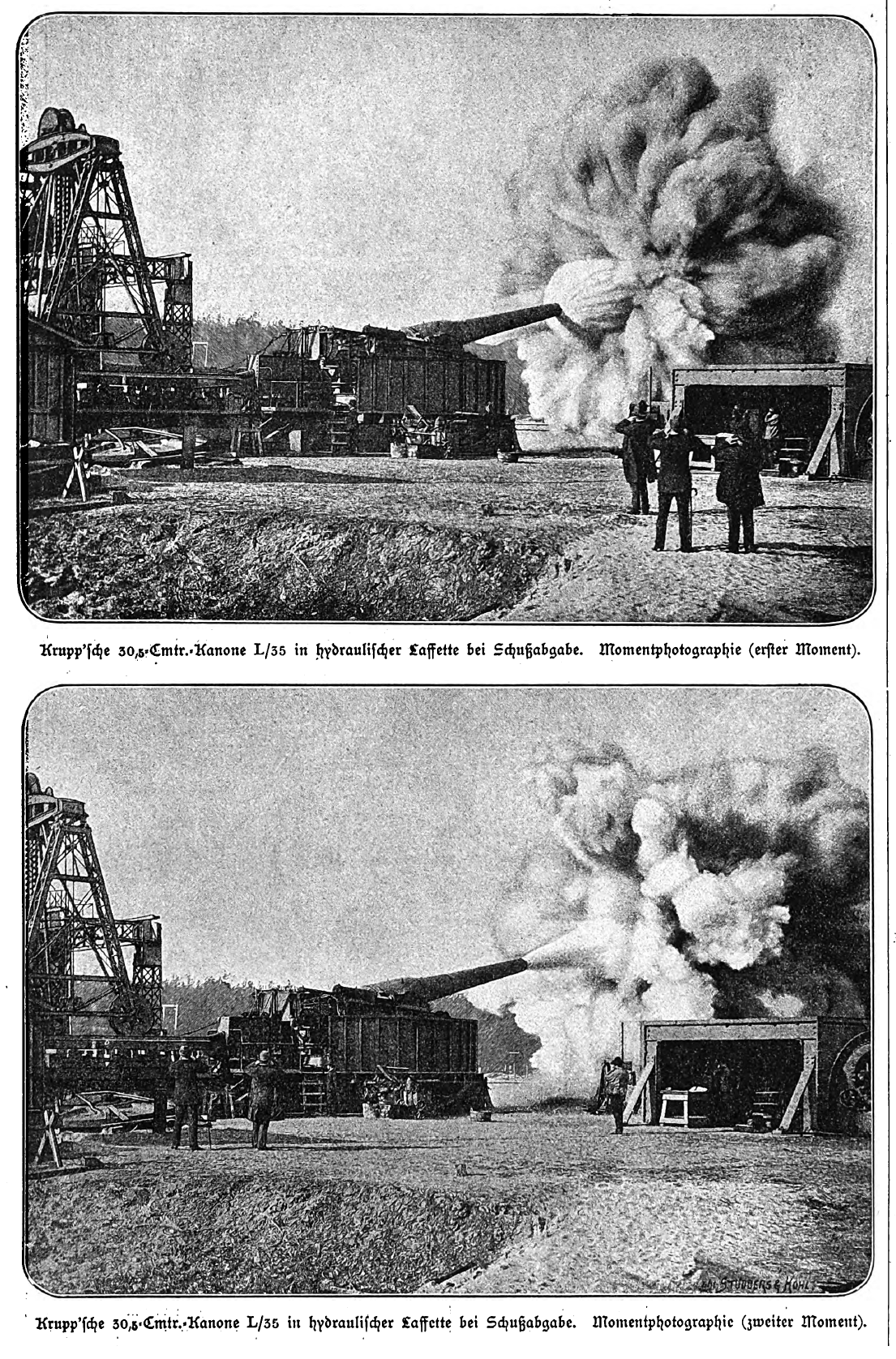
In Meppen in 1891

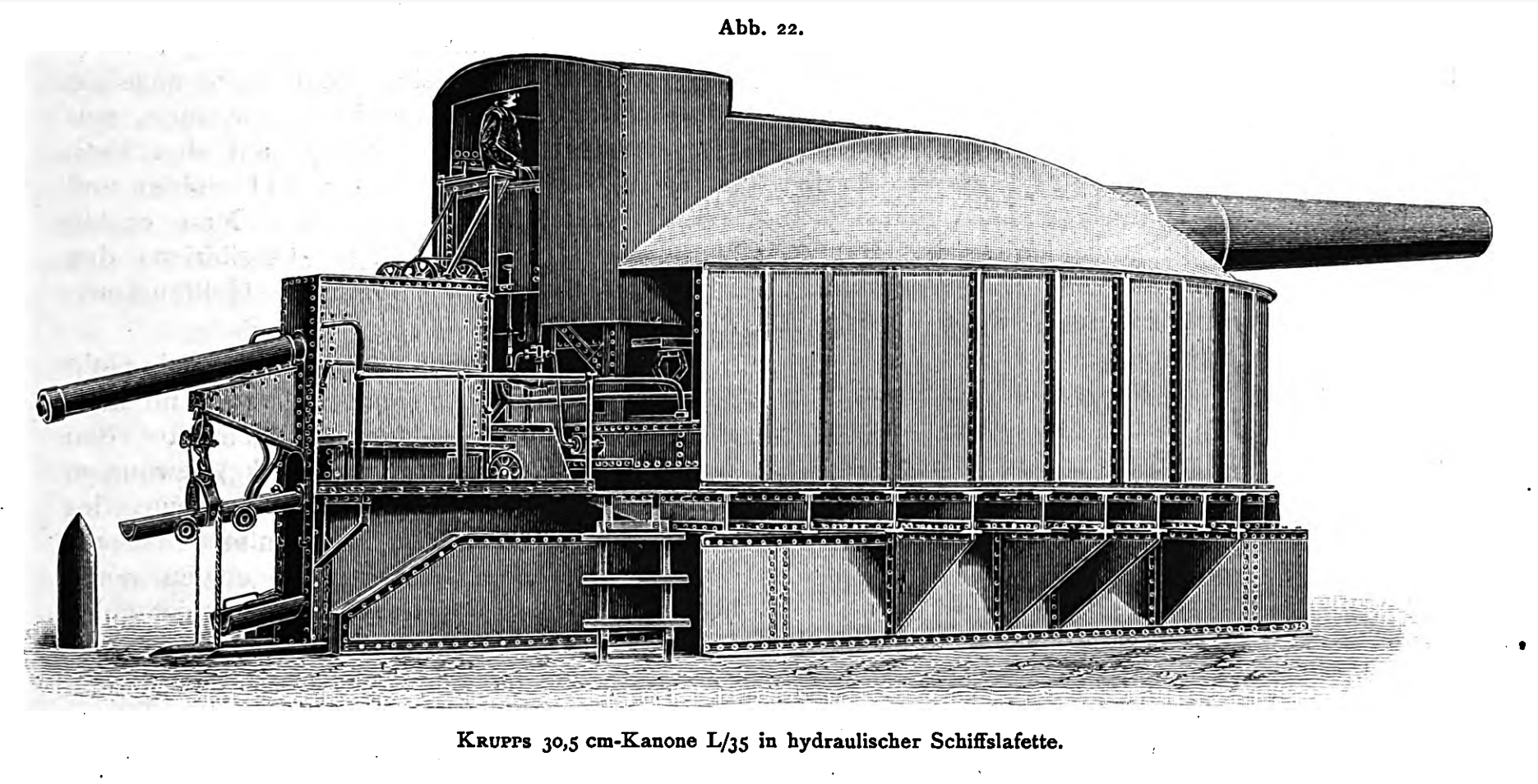
30.5 cm MRK L35 on a hydraulic ship carriage

In March 1882, the 30.5 cm MRK L/35 gun barrel was tested at the artillery proving grounds in Meppen. Indeed, the test of this recently completed gun was the main reason to stage a big event for artillery men from all over the world.

As produced, the gun barrel weighed 49,700 kg including the breech block. It had an overall length of 10,700 mm with a length of bore of 9,770 mm. The barrel had 68 grooves. These were 9 mm wide with a depth of 1.75 mm. The fields were 4.5 mm wide. The twist rate was 25 calibers.

In 1882, the gun fired a 3.5 kaliber long armor piercing projectile Panzer Granate or a 4 caliber long Zünder Granate, both weighing 455 kg. The charge was 147 kg of gunpowder. This propelled the projectile to a velocity of about 525 m/s. The gas pressure inside the gun was only about 2,650 Atm. This was very good for the safety and durability of the gun.

There were a few remarkable differences between the gun as it had been designed, and the gun that was tested in March 1882. The most significant was that the new gun used a somewhat increased (147 kg vs. 132 kg) charge to fire a much heavier (455 kg vs. 329 kg) projectile at a significantly lower speed (525 m/s vs. 605 m/s) than the old gun.

=== The barrels C/86 and C/87 ===
The original model of the 30.5 cm Mantel Ring Kanone L/35 was updated in the mid-1880s. There are references to a C/86 barrel and a somewhat lighter C/87 barrel with a slightly different internal configuration. The latter was shown at the World's Columbian Exposition in 1893.

The C/87 version of the 30.5 cm MRK L/35 was just as long as the earlier gun, but weighed 62,450 kg instead of only 49,700 kg. The obvious explanation was that the original had been reinforced / made heavier to handle bigger charges. Indeed, by 1893 it could fire with 195 kg of prismatic pulver C/82 for a velocity of 616 m/s or with 103 kg of cubic pulver C/89 for a velocity of 681 m/s.

=== On a hydraulic ship carriage (1891/3) ===
At the World's Columbian Exposition in 1893, the 30.5 cm MRK L/35 C/87 version was shown on a hydraulic ship carriage. The carriage dated from 1887 and had been tested at the Meppen proving grounds. The 1891 tests received some media attention. It was reported that with a charge of 200 kg of brown prismatic gunpowder, the shot attained a velocity of 610 m/s.

An interesting aspect of the trials at Meppen was that a photographer made two photographs of the gun as it moved on the carriage. The first photo was taken at a time when the backwards movement caused by the recoil had just begun. It was sharp enough to show the traces that the rifling left in the exhaust fumes. The second photo was taken from the position, but from another shot of the gun. It showed the gun at a moment when half of the backwards movement had been completed.

The idea of a hydraulic carriage (or turret as it had a 12t shield) was that a gun could easily and quickly turn to be aimed in different directions. All Krupp guns could also be operated by hand, but with the sheer mass of metal of the 30.5 cm L/35 (128.5t), this would be too slow for effective use of the gun. Even so: it took 50 seconds for the gun to make a 360 degree turn.

Hydraulic movement was chosen, because at the time the carriage was designed, electrical movement was still not reliable enough. The pressure of the water was 60 Atm. A further peculiarity was that the carriage had a fixed loading position. In this position, the gun was moved backwards and elevated to 13 degrees. The 1,500 kg breech block of the gun was then moved downwards so the projectile and charge could be moved in position by the hydraulic system. In this way, the gun captain handled the gun all by himself by controlling the several machines. He had a special place right behind the gun.

== Usage ==
=== Spain ===
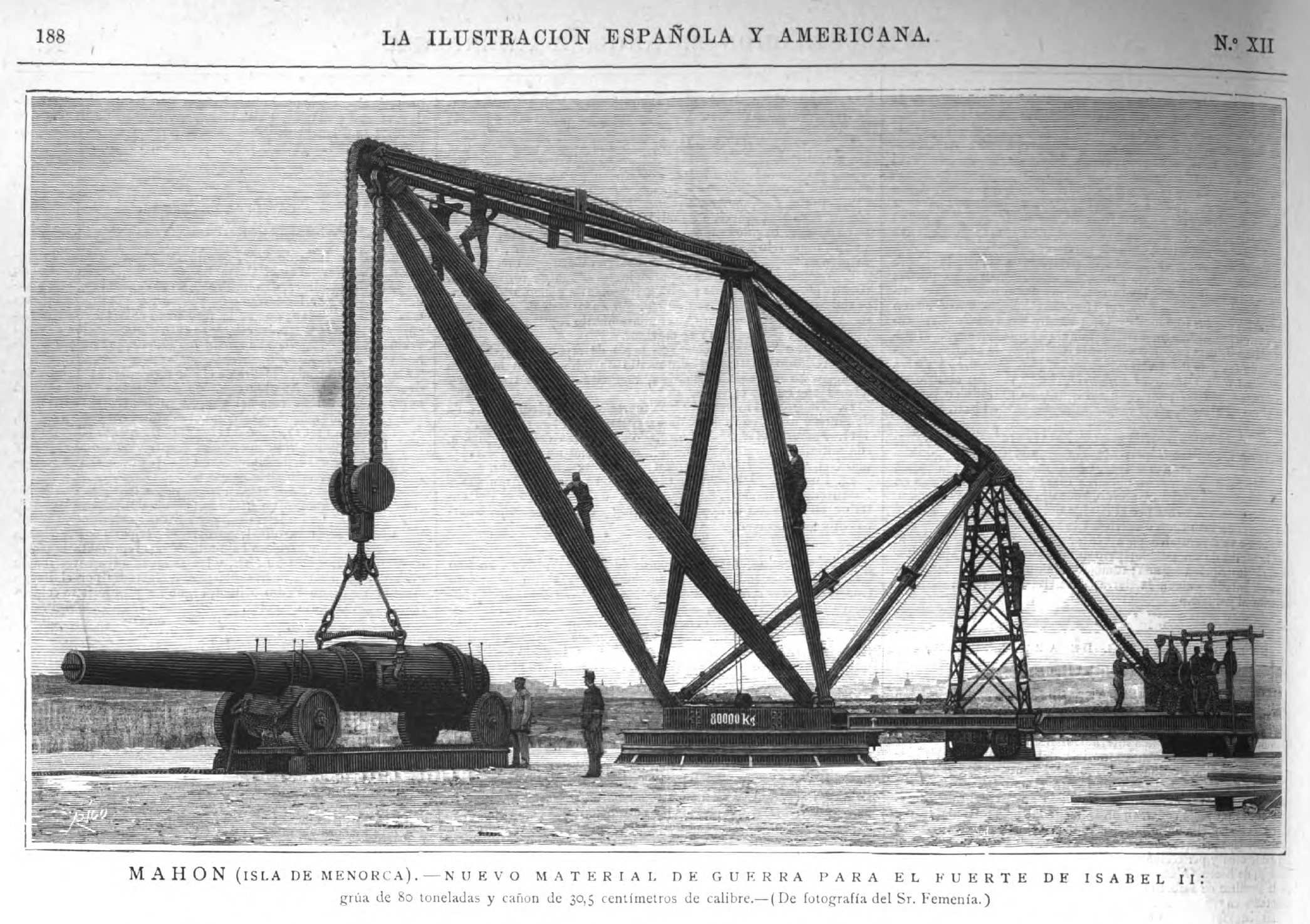
Transloading a 30.5 cm Krupp gun in Port Mahon 1885

In Spain, both models of the 30.5 cm MRK L/35 were used. The early model was known as Md.1880 and the later reinforced model was known as Md. 1887. In Cartagena, the Md. 1887 was used at the Santa Ana and Trincabotijas batteries. Spain also sent two 30.5 cm MRK L/35 to Cuba.

In the Balearic Islands Mahón on Menorca has a very good natural harbor. This made that in 1852 the big Fortress Isabel II was built to protect the harbor. The fort got two 30.5 cm MRK L/35 that weighed 49t, so Md. 1880 as well as two 26 cm Krupp guns. Some photos were made of how the 30.5 cm gun was moved by using a huge crane and a portable railway track.

=== Austria-Hungary ===
The Austro-Hungarian Navy used the 30.5 cm MRK L/35 to arm SMS Kronprinz Erzherzog Rudolf and SMS Kronprinzessin Erzherzogin Stephanie. Their weight and velocity shows that these were of the early model.

=== Denmark ===
For arming the Kastrup battery, Denmark ordered four 30.5 cm MRK L/35. This later became Kastrup fort, part of the Fortifications of Copenhagen.
