= 35.5 cm MRK L/25 =

1878 Krupp breech loader naval artillery

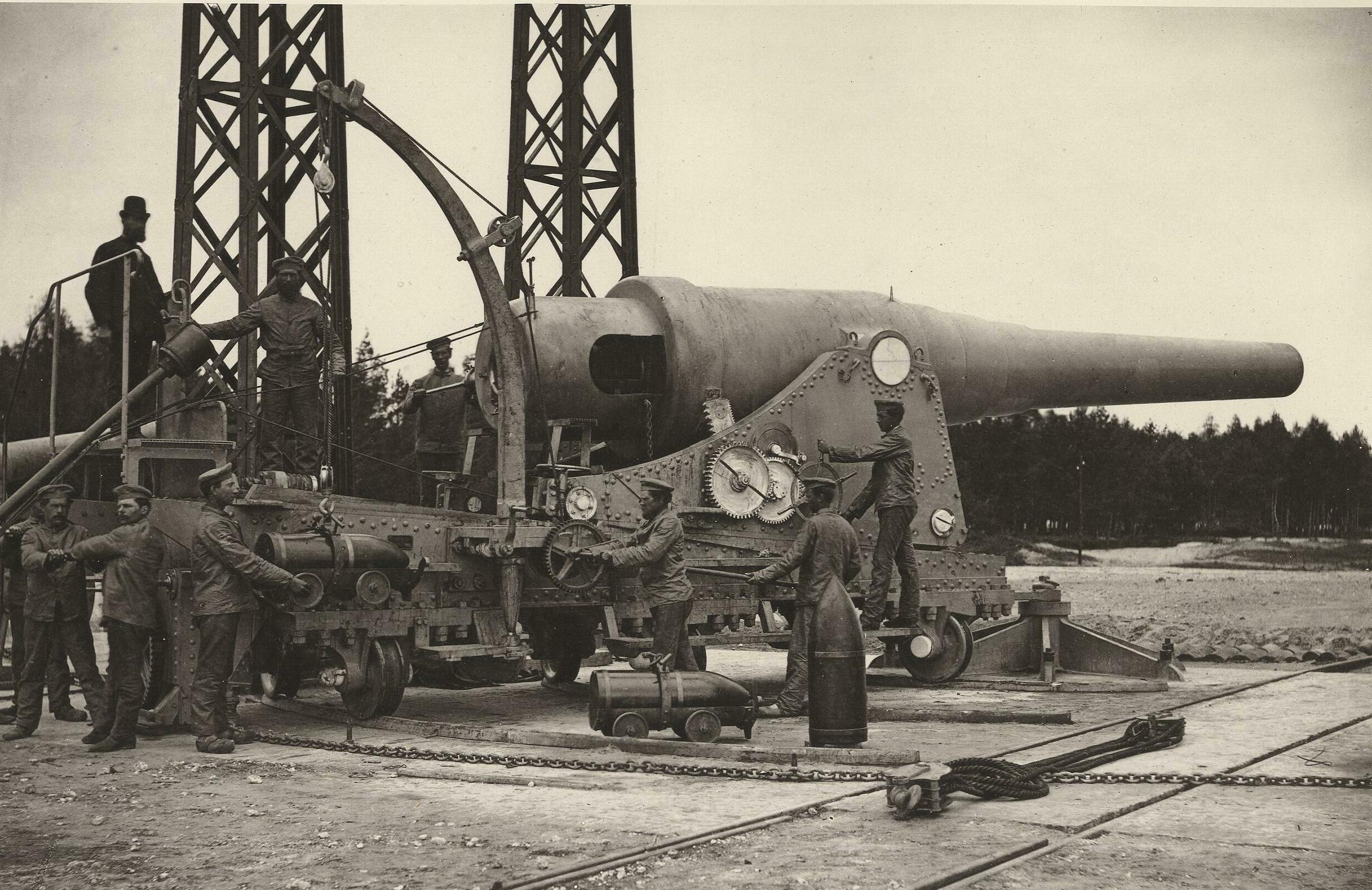
- The 35.5 cm MRK L/25
- Type: Naval artillery; Coastal artillery
- Place of origin: Germany

Service history
- Used by: Denmark

Production history
- Designer: Krupp
- Manufacturer: Krupp
- Produced: 1878
- No. built: 7

Specifications
- Mass: 52,000 kg
- Length: 8,880 mm (L/25)
- Caliber: 355 mm
- Breech: horizontal sliding wedge
- Muzzle velocity: 1878: 496 m/s

The 35.5 cm Mantel Ring Kanone L/25 was a 35.5 cm 25 caliber long Krupp Mantel Ring Kanone (MRK). It was a rifled breech loader built-up gun with a Krupp cylindroprismatic sliding breech. It was one of the few Krupp breechloaders that was designed to profit from slower burning gunpowders, but not for using very long projectiles. The gun was used by Denmark.

== Context ==
=== Up to the 35.5 cm MRK L/22.5 ===
In the race between naval guns and armor, Krupp developed a series of heavy rifled breech loader built-up guns (Ring Kanone) starting in the mid-1860s. At first, the Prussian Navy thought that a 15 cm gun would suffice to penetrate armor. This caliber soon proved insufficient, and by 1867 the caliber of the Krupp cannon had increased to 24 cm, see 24 cm K L/20. This was still not enough, and by 1875, the caliber of the biggest Ring Kanone had increased to 35.5 cm. The dimensions of this gun and its siblings followed a pattern. In general, they were either short (19 calibers long) or long (22 calibers long), but of comparable construction.

The 35.5 cm MRK L/22.5 was the direct ancestor of our 35.5 cm MRK L/25. It already had the Mantel Ring Kanone (MRK) construction, which meant that it was jacketed and hooped instead of only hooped. This increased the maximum explosive gas pressure that the barrel could withstand by about 25%.

=== The effects of slower burning gunpowder ===
When the North German Federal Navy accepted the Krupp system of guns in the late 1860s, Krupp guns already depended on using a type of slow-burning gunpowder called prismatic gunpowder. In German Prismatisches Pulver (P.P). This made it possible to use a higher charge without reaching a higher peak gas pressure inside the gun. The first kind of prismatic gunpowder that was adopted for service was the so-called P.P. c/68 which had a density of 1.66.

Already during the tests of the gunpowders that led to the P.P. c/68, it was known that for profiting from prismatic gunpowder the length of the gun was important: The higher the absolute length of the barrel, the more one would profit from the advantages of prismatic gunpowder. When in late 1868, Krupp got the order to design what would become the 21 cm RK L/22 and the 24 cm RK L/22, the requirements included making them longer but of the same weight as the previous shorter models.

=== Advances in gunpowder manufacturing ===
By the winter of 1875/76, when Krupp was developing and testing the Mantel Ring Kanone (MRK) construction, developments in gunpowder science had led to the P.P. c/75. This was a gunpowder with a density of 1.75. It burned even slower than the P.P. c/68 and was accepted for use in the 26 and 28 cm guns.

== Development ==
=== Problems with the new gunpowders ===
The discoveries about the properties of different kinds of gunpowder and the project to develop what would become the P.P. c/75 led to a lot of experiments. It also proved quite a challenge to actually produce the new kinds of gunpowder in a uniform quality. E.g. even in 1876 a big variation in the density of a batch of P.P. c/75 led to dangerously high pressures in the 28 cm gun.

Another problem was that gunpowder that sufficed for one gun did not necessarily work in another gun. A good quality P.P. c/75 led to excellent results in the 26 and 28 cm guns. However, with the heavier 30.5 cm MRK L/22, it led to many problems with dangerously high peak pressures.

=== First longer guns ===
In light of what Krupp knew about developments in gunpowder, it's logical that it wanted to make longer guns. Longer guns were the way to profit from the advantages that slower burning gunpowder offered.

One of the first heavy caliber guns which was significantly longer than the L/19's and L/22's of the original Krupp system was the 17 cm RK L/25, developed in 1874. However, a test of this gun showed that while the P.P. c/75 gunpowder did well in many respects, it did not suffice for this 17 cm gun, because not enough of the charge burned inside the barrel.

=== The 35.5 cm MRK L/25 is revealed ===
In 1878 Krupp presented its latest achievements to a large delegation of national and foreign officers and dignitaries. On 27 June 1878 the guests attended the test-firing of a 15.5 cm gun that was in an armored emplacement. (The test of this Panzerkanone was a sequence to a November 1877 test.) On 2 and 3 July 1878, the guests then attended a large test-firing at Krupp's new artillery range in Meppen.

In Meppen, the new 35.5 cm MRK L/25 was the centerpiece of the show. Other guns that where tested simultaneously were the 30.5 cm MRK L/25, the 'Dutch' 28 cm A No. 1 gun and a 15 cm gun.

Of these guns, the 35.5 cm MRK L/25, the 30.5 cm MRK L/25, and the 15 cm MRK L/26 were long guns, called 'lange', the 28 cm gun was only L/22 long and was called 'kurze'. The three heaviest guns were mounted on a coastal carriage, while the 15 cm gun was on a ship carriage.

== Characteristics ==
=== The barrel and carriage ===
The 35.5 cm MRK L/25 had a caliber of 355 mm. Its overall length was 8,880 mm with a length of bore of 7,740 mm. It weighed 52,000 kg including the breech.

The barrel had 80 grooves with the lands in between being 4.5 mm wide. The twist rate was constant with a length of 16.0 m.

The coastal carriage on which the gun was mounted weighed 32,750 kg. It had a firing height of 2,670 mm and allowed an elevation to 18 degrees and a declination to 6 degrees.

=== Projectiles, charge and velocities ===
The data about the projectiles and charge relate to the 1878 tests. It is quite likely that later advancements in gunpowder technology led to improved results.

There were three projectiles: The steel grenade of 525 kg with 12.6 kg of explosives; The chilled iron grenade of 525 kg with 6 kg of explosives; The normal grenade of 444 kg with 23.4 kg of explosives. The charge used was 115 kg of Prismatic Pulver with one channel and a density of 1.75 (70 prisms per layer). This was loaded by two bags.

On 2 July 1878, the average velocity measured at 95 m from the muzzle was 495.9 m/s.

== Use ==
In 1879 it became known that Denmark had ordered six 35.5 cm guns for the Fortifications of Copenhagen. It is not immediately clear whether these were the L/25. The timing suggests this, but some later photographs probably show a later model.

The Danish ironclad HDMS Tordenskjold used the 35.5 cm MRK L/25.

== Further development ==
The same innovations that had let to the development of the 35.5 cm MRK L/25 would soon be applied to an even heavier gun. This was the 40 cm MRK L/25 which was tested only one year after the 35.5 cm gun had been tested.
