= 28 cm RK L/22 =

1870 German Navy coastal defence gun

28 cm Ring Kanone L/22
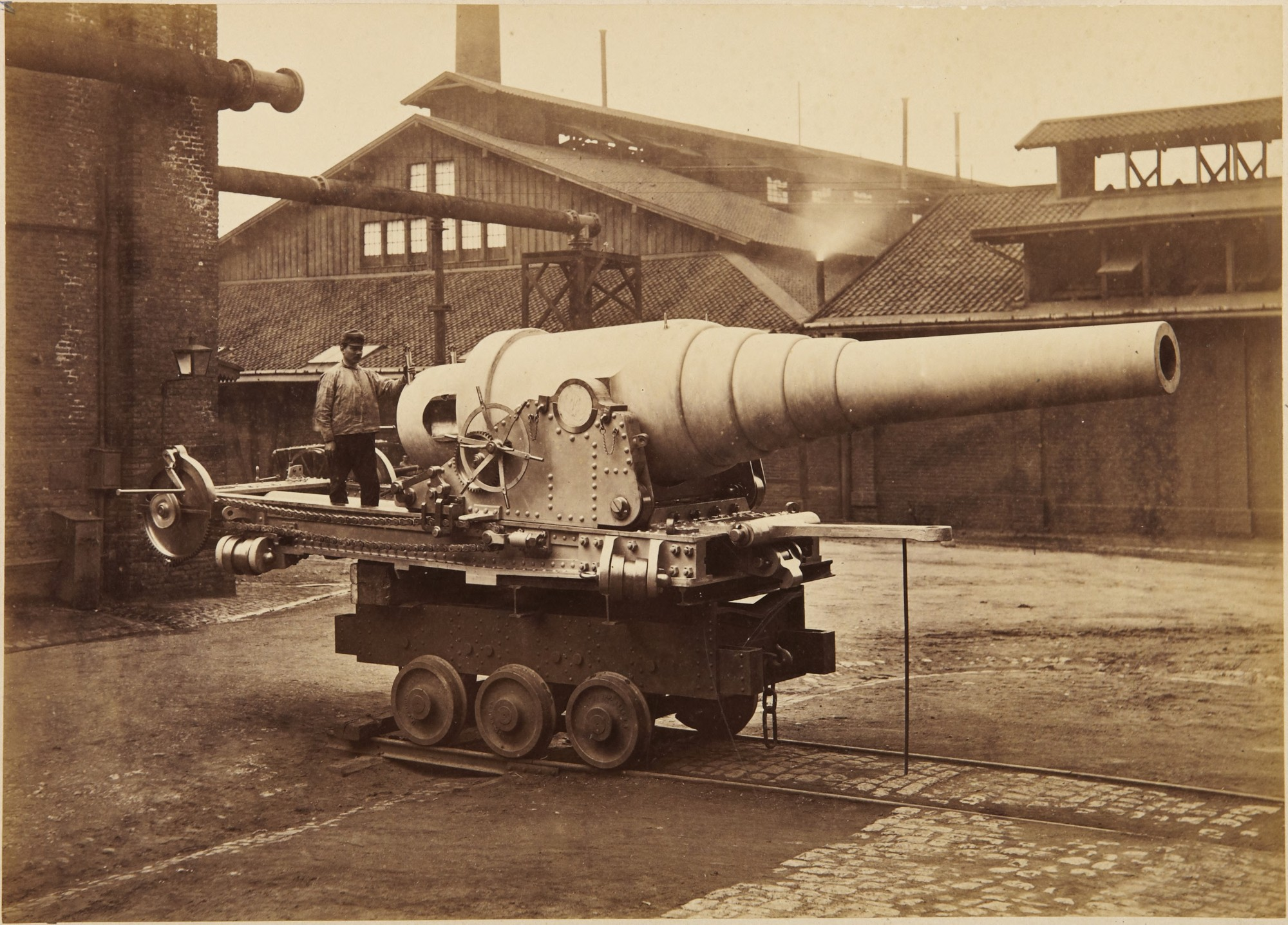
- Early (279 mm) version of the 28 cm K L/22
- Type: Coastal Artillery
- Place of origin: Kingdom of Prussia

Service history
- Used by: Imperial German Navy

Production history
- Designer: Krupp
- Designed: 1867-1876
- Manufacturer: Krupp
- Produced: 1870

Specifications
- Mass: 27,500 kg
- Length: 6.10 m (L/22)
- Caliber: 283 mm
- Breech: horizontal sliding wedge
- Muzzle velocity: 494 m/s.
- Effective firing range: 6,000 m.
- Maximum firing range: 9,000 m.

The 28 cm RK L/22 was a 28 cm caliber Krupp Ring Kanone (built-up gun) used for coastal defence. It was a rifled breech loader with a Krupp cylindroprismatic sliding breech. For some time it was the heaviest German naval gun.

== Background ==
After the invention of the built-up gun in the 1830s, artillery manufacturers strove to increase the charge that was used in their cannon. Krupp made its own variant of the built-up gun, the so-called Ring Kanone. For naval use, it concentrated its efforts on 21 and 24 cm guns. In 1868 Prussia noted that the 24 cm gun would not suffice as highest caliber. On board ships it would resort to a 26 cm gun. For the navy it would profit from Krupp's work for Russia.

Imperial Russia was an important early customer for Krupp guns. In 1865 Krupp made a 21 cm Ring Kanone for Russia. In 1866, a 23 cm gun which was later changed to a Ring Kanone. In 1864, Russia had ordered a single muzzle-loading 11-inch gun at Krupp. It was cast as a one-piece, solid barrel. Shortly before being finished, it was changed to breechloading with a simple Krupp horizontal sliding wedge and a Broadwell ring, and was ringed, i.e. changed to a built-up gun.

In 1868 the Russian 28 cm Ring Kanone was delivered to the Russian government. The Russian government then subjected it to a durability test at the Krupp factory headed by General Nikolai V. Mayevski (known for his work on the ballistic coefficient). This durability test was about shooting with solid shot of 225 kg and with an explosive charge of 37.5 kg.

A delegate of the Prussian Artillerie Prüfungskommission (artillery test commission) had attended part of these Russian tests. On 15 September 1868, he noted that the Russian 28 cm fired the 225 kg shot with a velocity of 397 m/s, and that it would penetrate iron armor of 330 mm or an armored hull of 254 mm iron with wooden backing. While it was known that the 24 cm K L/20, which was then being tested near Berlin, did not suffice to penetrate the strongest ship armor, a higher caliber gun was needed. This would become even more urgent when more ships would get gun turrets.

== Development ==
=== Adopting the 11 inch caliber ===
The delegate of the artillery test commission who attended the durability test of the Russian 28 cm gun at the Krupp facilities advised to test the Russian gun. The reasons were that it was much more powerful than the 24 cm K L/20, but still light enough to be moved by the available machinery. He also added a drawing of the gun to his message. In October 1868, the Allgemeines Kriegsdepartement then approved the acquisition of a 28 cm gun and carriage.

The Prussian artillery test commission then issued a report about the required caliber system for the coastal artillery. It advised to use guns of 15 cm, 21 cm, and 27 cm caliber, as well as a 21 cm mortar. The Allgemeines Kriegsdepartement and the Navy Ministry approved the advice, but changed the 27 cm caliber to a 28 cm caliber. This caliber was really 27.94 cm, i.e. 11 inch rounded to 28 cm.

=== The first German 28 cm gun ===
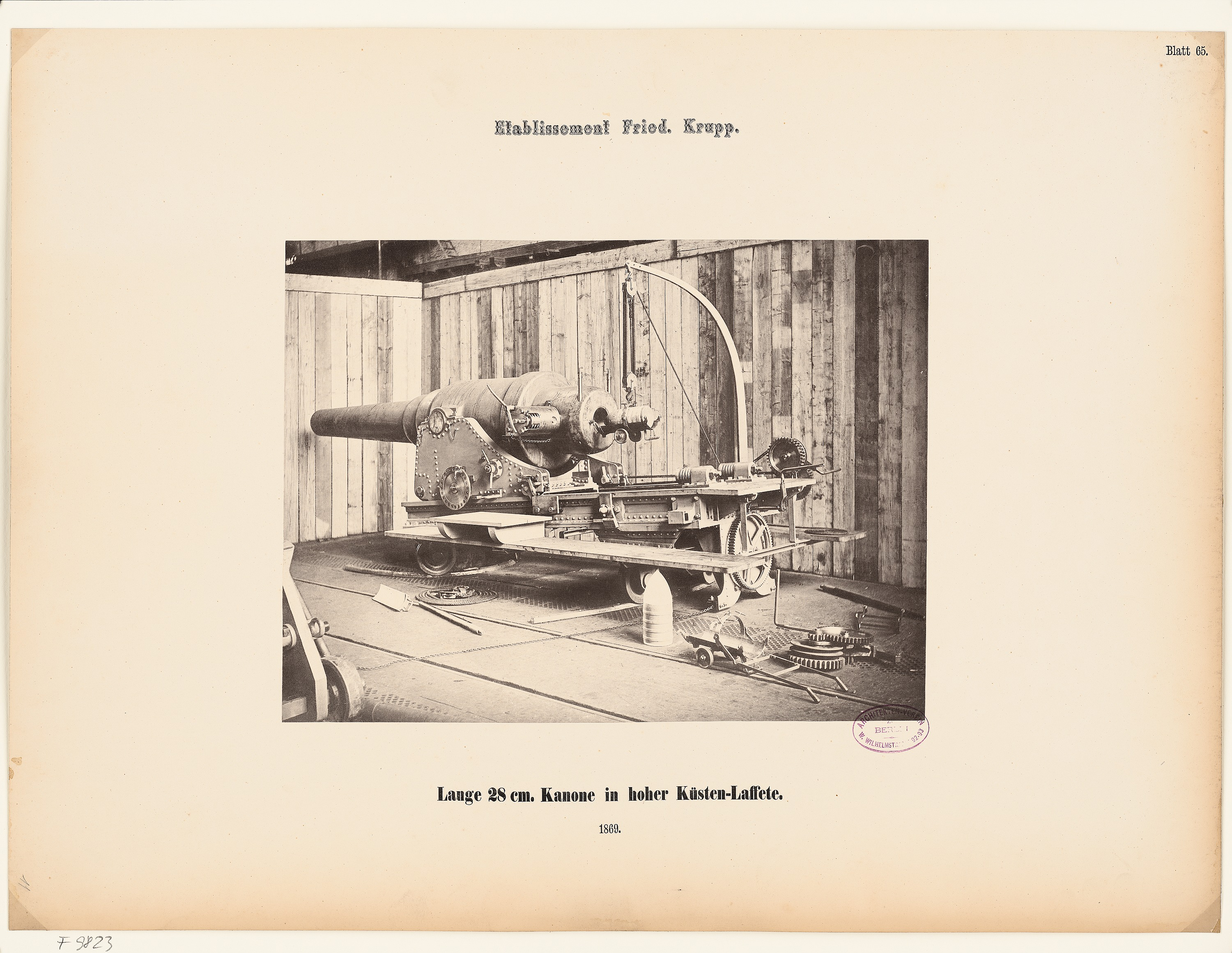
Early version of the 28 cm Ring Kanone L/22

After Krupp had submitted several designs, the first 28 cm gun barrel was ordered in July 1869. It was made to fire shot with a twist rate (distance at which the shot makes a complete turn around its axis) of 69.8 caliber and to use a charge of 40 kg. This first 28 cm gun was ready in the Summer of 1870. Due to the Franco-Prussian War it was then placed in a coastal battery.

In the Summer of 1872 and in May 1873, the gun was tested against a mock up armored hull. With 40 kg of gunpowder it fired with a velocity of 427 m/s. Somewhat later 47.5 kg of gunpowder was used, which increased velocity to 440 m/s.

The development of the Prismatic Pulver c/75 (PP c/75) was essential to improve the capabilities of the 28 cm gun. This kind of gunpowder had a higher specific weight and led to lower atmospheric pressure in the barrel. With 57 kg of Prismatic Pulver c/75 the 28 cm gun fired shot with a velocity of 466 m/s.

=== The second 28 cm gun ===
The further development of the lone 28 cm gun was delayed by the much more urgent tests of the 17 cm and 26 cm RK L/22 guns. These guns were used on the Preussen-class ironclads.

In early 1874, a second 28 cm gun entered into the tests. It had 36 wedge (keil) grooves and a twist rate of 50 calibers. The charge was increased to 47.5 kg of Prismatic Pulver c/75, and a velocity of 462 m/s was attained. These early tests also showed that with the available machinery, the 28 cm caliber was the largest that a crew could effectively handle.

The next steps were the rifling of the part of the barrel in which the shot were placed; the introduction of shot that used copper rings to attain twist; and the introduction of charges of 52.5-57.5 kg. In early 1876, tests were conducted on the new artillery range at Kummersdorf. With a charge of 55 kg of PP c/75, a velocity of 470 m/s was reached.

=== The final 28 cm RK L/22 (283 mm) design ===
The 28 cm gun got its final inner construction when the Artillery test commission decided to change the barrel to resemble the lighter 26 cm RK L/22 gun. This was done to switch from lead to copper driving bands on the projectiles. The 36 wedged grooves were changed to wider, but shallower parallel grooves (Parallelzüge). Decreasing the depth of the grooves was achieved by increasing the (ungrooved) caliber of the gun to 283 mm. The advantage of boring up the gun was that existing guns could be changed to use copper driving bands.

After several more tests, the charge was set at 58 kg of PP c/75. Meanwhile, the Allgemeines Kriegs Departement ordered 20 28 cm barrels. The navy, for which 9 barrels with 70 caliber twist rate had been completed in 1870, now decided to let these be bored up to 283 mm with retention of the twist rate. Nine more guns, which were not yet completely finished, got the same twist rate as the second test gun, i.e. 50 calibers twist rate.

The 28 cm gun barrel No. 8 was subjected to a durability test. It fired 515 shot, about 200 of these with a charge of 58–60 kg. The effect was that the powder chamber was significantly enlarged at some points, but that was all the damage that it suffered. After these shots, the gun was still reliable and serviceable in January 1878.

=== The 28 cm Mantel Ring Kanone L/22 ===
The Mantel Ring Kanone type of built-up gun would become the successor of the Ring Kanone. The difference in construction was that the strong inner gun tube was surrounded by another tube and mantle, before the rings (hoops) were applied. The made the gun barrel stronger, because the inner was already put under pressure by the mantle. Inside the barrel, the rifled part was longer.

In 1877 the German admiralty had Krupp change two 28 cm RK L/22 to the mantle ring construction. Krupp expected that with 50 kg of gunpowder, the 28 cm MRK L/22 would attain the same velocity as the previous 28 cm RK L/22.

== Characteristics ==
=== The 28 cm Ring Kanone L/22 ===
The 28 cm Ring Kanone L/22 was first known as the 28 cm or 11 inch gun. When the German Navy officially adopted the metric system, it became known as the 28 cm Kanone. When the Mantel Ring Kanone, or MRK version of the gun was developed, the original became known as the 28 cm Ring Kanone. The 28 cm Ring Kanone L/22 got its final name in 1885, when the German Navy issued a renaming order for its artillery. The gun which had been known as 28 cm Ring Kanone became the 28 cm Ring Kanone L/22 abbreviated 28 cm RK L/22.

In its final design the 28 cm Ring Kanone had a caliber of 283 mm. Measured in the grooves, this was 287 mm. It was 6,100 mm long. The rifling consisted of 36 parallel grooves which were 2 mm deep and 20.2 mm wide. The parts (fields) between the grooves were 4.5 mm wide. The gun weight 27,500 kg, including the 1,020 kg breech block.

=== Carriage ===
The regular coastal gun mount for the 28 cm Ring Kanone supposed that it would be behind a 2 m high wall. Krupp made a carriage that mounted the gun at a height of 2.465 m. It enabled the gun to decline 5 degrees and to elevate to 24 degrees. This carriage weighed 16,500 kg, including floor parts. There was also an older version of the carriage, which mounted the gun at a height of 2.330 m. Both versions used cog wheels for aiming.

For more elaborate fortifications or gun turrets, there was a Minimalscharte Lafette or 'minimal embrasure carriage', which allowed to aim the gun from behind the smallest possible embrasure / loophole. This carriage was made by Gruson, and allowed an elevation from -3 degrees to + 15 degrees. It used a hydraulic system for aiming. This carriage weighed 27,970 kg.

=== Shot ===
The 28 cm RK L/22 shot a 28 cm hardened (hartguss) grenade c/76 with a charge of 58 kg of prismatice gunpowder. This grenade attained a velocity of 473 m/s. With an elevation of 11.1 degrees, this reached to a distance of 6,000 m. The grenade was meant to hit the target at angle of only 1.2 degrees at 2,500 m. The long grenade (lang Granate) c/76 was also fired with a charge of 58 kg. This attained a velocity of 494 m/s. With an elevation of 22.1 degrees, this reached to a distance of 9,000 m. At that distance it hit at an angle of 30 degrees and required a 9.4 by 55 m target to have a 50% chance to hit.

Later shot fired by the 28 cm RK L/22 were: the 28 cm Hartgussgranate L/2,5 previously known as 28 cm Hartgussgranate C/76; and the 28 cm Granate L/2,5, previously known as 28 cm Granate C/76.

== Use ==
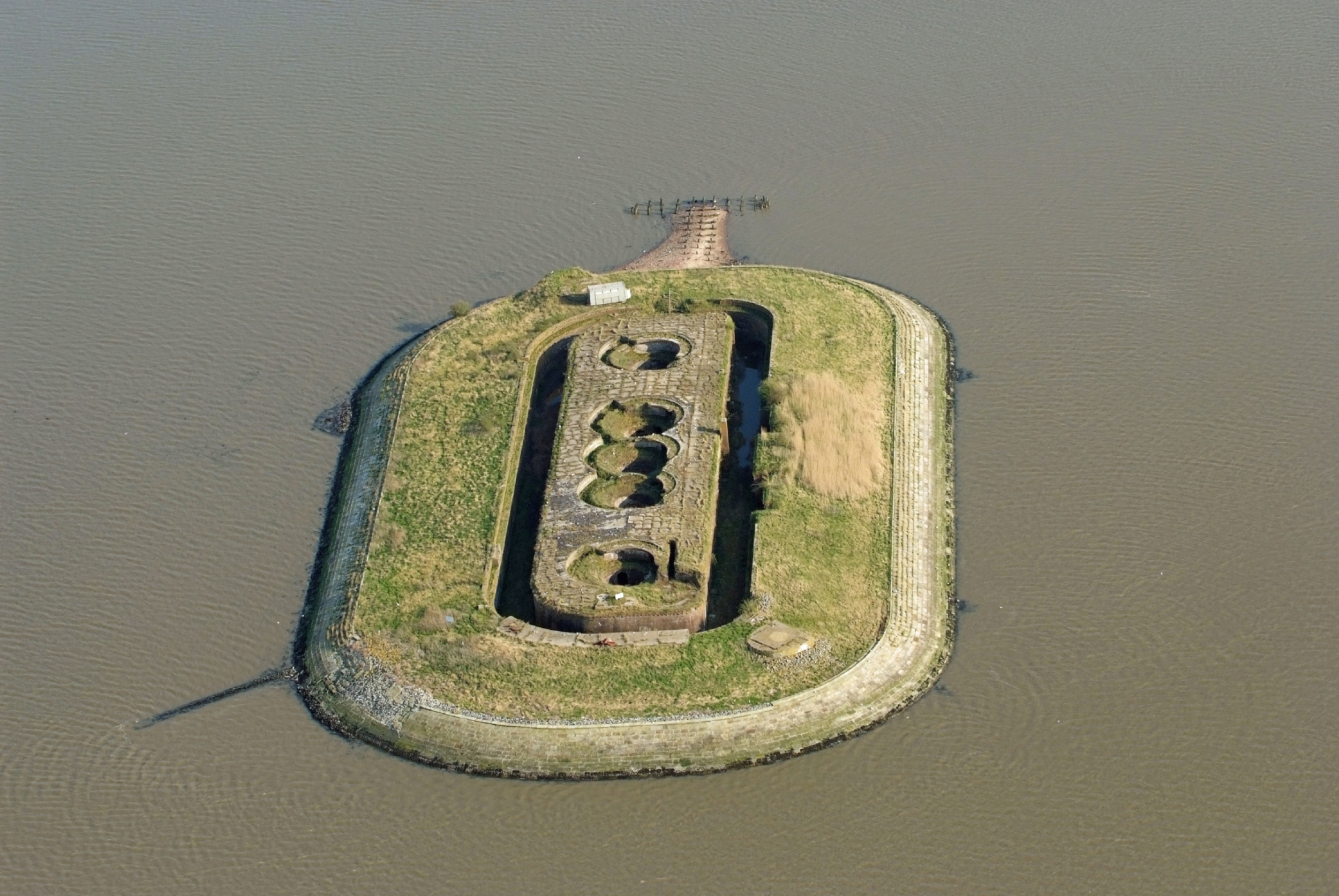
Fortress island Langlütjen II

The 28 cm RK L/22 was used at multiple places on the German coast.

The 28 cm RK L/22 was also used in the armored gun turrets on the mouth of the Weser. It is known to have been used in the gun turret of Langlütjen II, where it was mounted on the minimalscharte carriage.

In 1873, Turkey ordered 12 28 cm RK L/22 for its coastal defence.

In 1874, Portugal ordered 6 28 cm RK L/22 for its coastal defence.

== Further developments ==
After tests in 1872/73, the German navy concluded that for the coastal artillery, the 28 cm caliber would not be heavy enough in the near future. This led to the development of the 30.5 cm RK L/22 and later the 30.5 cm MRK L/22, which ended up on board the Wespe class armored gunboats. Developments in artillery then changed from increasing the caliber to lengthening the gun barrel and the shot. With the 28 cm MRK L/35 and 28 cm MRK L/40, the German Navy again opted for the 28 cm caliber for its heaviest guns.
