= 30.5 cm MRK L/25 =

1880 coastal artillery by Krupp

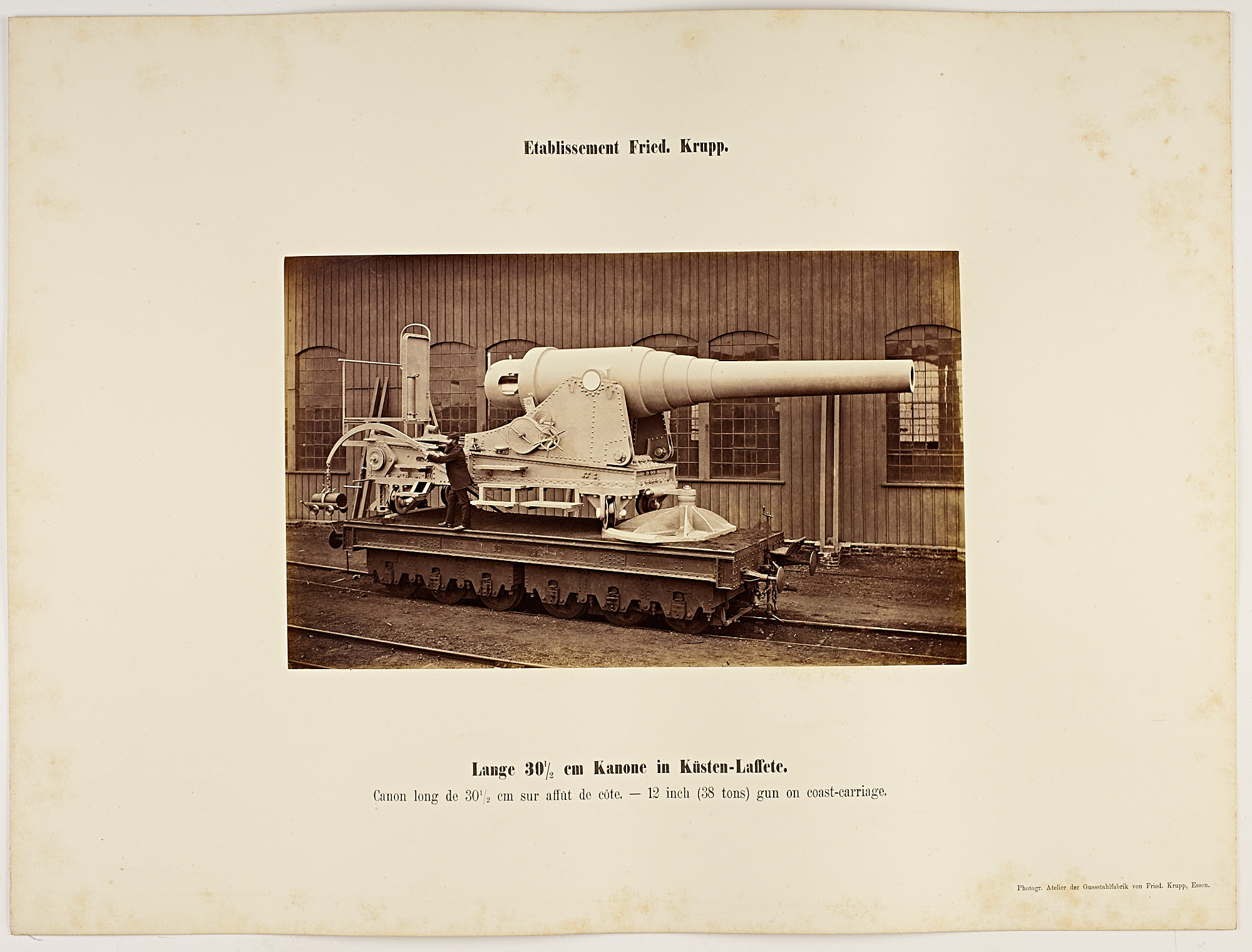
- Early model 30.5 cm MRK L/25 on an old coastal carriage
- Type: Coastal Artillery
- Place of origin: Germany

Service history
- Used by: Dutch Army; Imperial Chinese Navy

Production history
- Designer: Krupp
- Designed: 1880
- Manufacturer: Krupp
- Produced: 1880

Specifications
- Mass: 38,000 kg
- Length: 7,650 mm (L/25)
- Caliber: 305 mm
- Breech: horizontal sliding wedge
- Carriage: NL: minimum port-carriage
- Muzzle velocity: 468 m/s in 1883

The 30.5 cm Mantel Ring Kanone L/25 was a 30.5 cm 25 caliber long Krupp Mantel Ring Kanone. It was a further development of the earlier 30.5 cm MRK L/22. It came in different models. The Chinese Navy used the gun on board the Dingyuan-class ironclads. The Dutch Army used one of these models as coastal artillery. Due to changes in the interior configuration of the gun, this was basically a shorter version of the 30.5 cm MRK L/35.

== Context ==
=== The preceding Krupp 30.5 cm L/22 ===
The 1862 Battle of Hampton Roads showed how difficult it was for contemporary artillery to penetrate a ship's armor. This started a race to increase the effectiveness of armor and artillery. For the latter this meant a steady increase in caliber, length, and charge. In 1868, Krupp demonstrated the excellence of its cast steel rifled breech loading built-up guns of 21 and 24 cm caliber. Meanwhile, the caliber of heavy guns continued to increase.

At the 1873 Vienna World's Fair, Krupp showed a 30.5 cm L/22 Ring Kanone, which it had developed on its own initiative. The gun drew the attention of the German Navy, who wanted to use it for its coastal defence. It ordered a few guns of the Vienna model, but did not take it into use as coastal artillery. Somewhat later, the German Navy ordered the 30.5 cm MRK L/22 for its Wespe-class gunboats. This was a hooped and jacketed version of the Vienna gun, which had only been hooped.

=== Krupp starts to develop L/25 guns ===
In June 1878 Friedrich Alfred Krupp invited artillery officers from 13 countries to visit the Krupp firing ranges. On 2 and 3 July tests took place on the firing range in Meppen. These would also be the first major test of the firing range itself.

The main subject of the tests was an improved version of the 35.5 cm RK, the 35.5 cm MRK L/25. At a weight of 52t against 57.5t for the previous model, it was much lighter. It was also longer: 8.888 m vs. 8 m. The effectiveness of the 35.5 cm gun made a big impression. In a long description of the event there were also two sentences referring to the successful test of a 30.5 cm gun at 2,000 m and the test of a 28 cm gun at 10,000 m.

A Dutch officer summarized the tests as involving 'long steel guns of 35, 30 and 15 cm' and 'the short steel gun of 28 cm recently adopted by the Dutch navy' (28 cm A No. 1 gun). A calculation of the length in calibers of these 'long' guns, shows that these were 25 calibers long (L/25). It meant that for its big guns, Krupp now offered a standard length of L/25 instead of L/22. Krupp also used the label 'lange' for the 30.5 cm L/25.

== Several models ==
There were basically three 30.5 cm MRK L/25 models: The early model, the 30.5 cm MRK L/25 c/80 light, and the 30.5 cm MRK L/25 c/80 heavy. The early model would find customers in the Netherlands and in China and is described below. The c/80 models require some explanation of the c/80 label.

'C/80' stands for 'Konstruktion 1880' or Model 1880. The German word 'Konstruktion' has multiple meanings. It might mean: 'to design something', but it can also refer to the result of the design. The meaning of c/80 is 'designed' in 1880. Shortly before 1880, the tests of the heavy L/25 guns, the extensive test of the 15 cm MRK L/28, and those of even longer lighter guns showed that longer guns with longer projectiles would be very effective. Krupp then designed the L/30 and L/35 versions of its heavy guns. A table of these designs was published in 1880. Already in 1880, a 15 cm L/30 was tested. In 1881 a 26 cm MRK L/30 followed. In March 1882, the first tests of 35 caliber long guns took place. These were the 15 cm L/35 and the 30.5 cm MRK L/35. Therefore, c/80 means designed in 1880.

== The early 30.5 cm MRK L/25 model ==
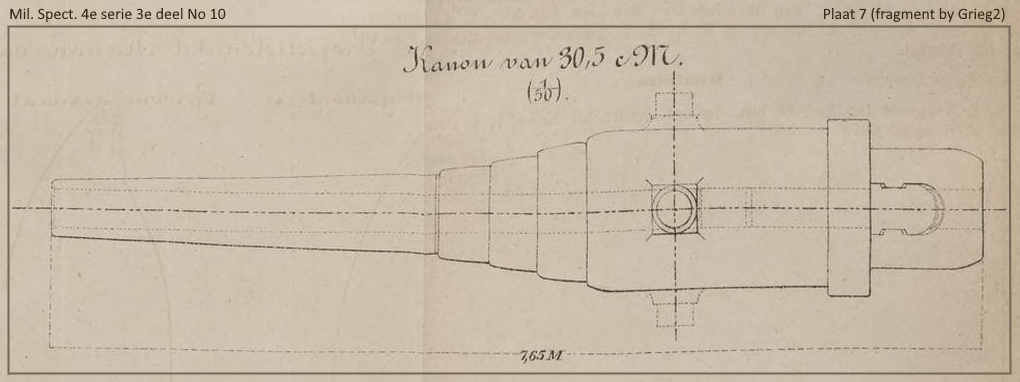
Early model of the 30.5 cm MRK L/25

The early 30.5 cm MRK L/25 model tested in 1878 had a total length of 7,650 mm, a length of bore of 6,720 mm, and weighed 38,700 kg. It had 68 grooves, with the fields in between being 4.5 mm wide. The old coastal carriage on which it was mounted weighed 20,950 kg. It gave the gun a firing height of 2.38 m and allowed 18 degrees elevation and 6 degrees declination. The early model fired steel and chilled iron grenades of 333 kg and a regular cast iron grenade of 282 kg. The charge that propelled these projectiles weighed 72 kg. The steel grenade had an initial velocity of 500 m/s. All projectiles were 2.8 caliber long.

The use of a charge of only 72 kg makes it appear as if the early model was basically a lengthened 30.5 cm MRK L/22, which also used 72 kg of gunpowder in the first years that it was used. The difference in length of bore was 6.72 vs 5.77 m or 95 cm. The difference in overall length was 7.65 vs 6.70 m, which is also 95 cm. The rifling of the two guns was different.

During the 1878 test, the gun fired 10 shot at a target 2,000 m away. The first shot hit 175 cm below and 255 cm to the right of the target. The other nine shot did not deviate more than 115 cm from the target. The velocity was about 495 m/s at 75 m from the muzzle.

The tests in Meppen also gave some data about the space that the gunpowder had to explode in, the anfänglicher Verbrennungsraum. On average, this was 943 mm long with a diameter of 311 mm. This was equal to 71.63 dm^{3} or 1.0 dm^{3} per kg of pulver with a charge of 72 kg.

== The Chinese model ==
The Chinese navy used the 30.5 cm MRK L/25 on board the Dingyuan-class ironclads. There are several descriptions of the Dingyuan's guns. Brassey's had the Dingyuan's guns as weighing 37 long tons (37.6 t) and Wespe's guns as weighing 35 long tons (35.6 t). This exactly reflects the weight of the shorter 30.5 cm MRK L/22, but is one ton off from the early L/25 model. Local papers gave more details. In April 1883, the guns of Dingyuan were installed in Swinemünde. They were then described as 25 ft (7.6 m) long and weighing 750 quintals, i.e. 37,500 kg.

The weight of the gun as it was reported at Swinemünde is about 1,000 kg less than that of the gun that was tested in 1878. The new weight also happens to be in line with Brassey's 37 long tons (37.6 t). Furthermore, the guns of Zhenyuan were tested near Kiel in 1884. Reports stated that the guns were 25 calibers long and used a charge of 100 kg of gunpowder. The increased charge of 100 kg of gunpowder points to the Chinese gun having been adapted to profit from higher charges and longer projectiles.

== The Dutch model ==
=== The model for the Netherlands ===
In the Netherlands, the Minister of War and other authorities had also noted the Vienna 30.5 cm L/22 Ring Kanone. One of the highest Dutch defense priorties was the naval base Willemsoord at Den Helder. In 1876, the Netherlands wanted to use the Vienna gun at Den Helder. The reasoning was simple. The new battery that was to be built as part of the Fortifications of Den Helder had to able to penetrate the armor of any ship that was shallow enough to pass the deep water in front of it. Referring to an 1875 test of the Vienna gun, the minister of war stated that only the 30,5 cm caliber gun could do that.

=== Delayed construction of Fort Harssens ===
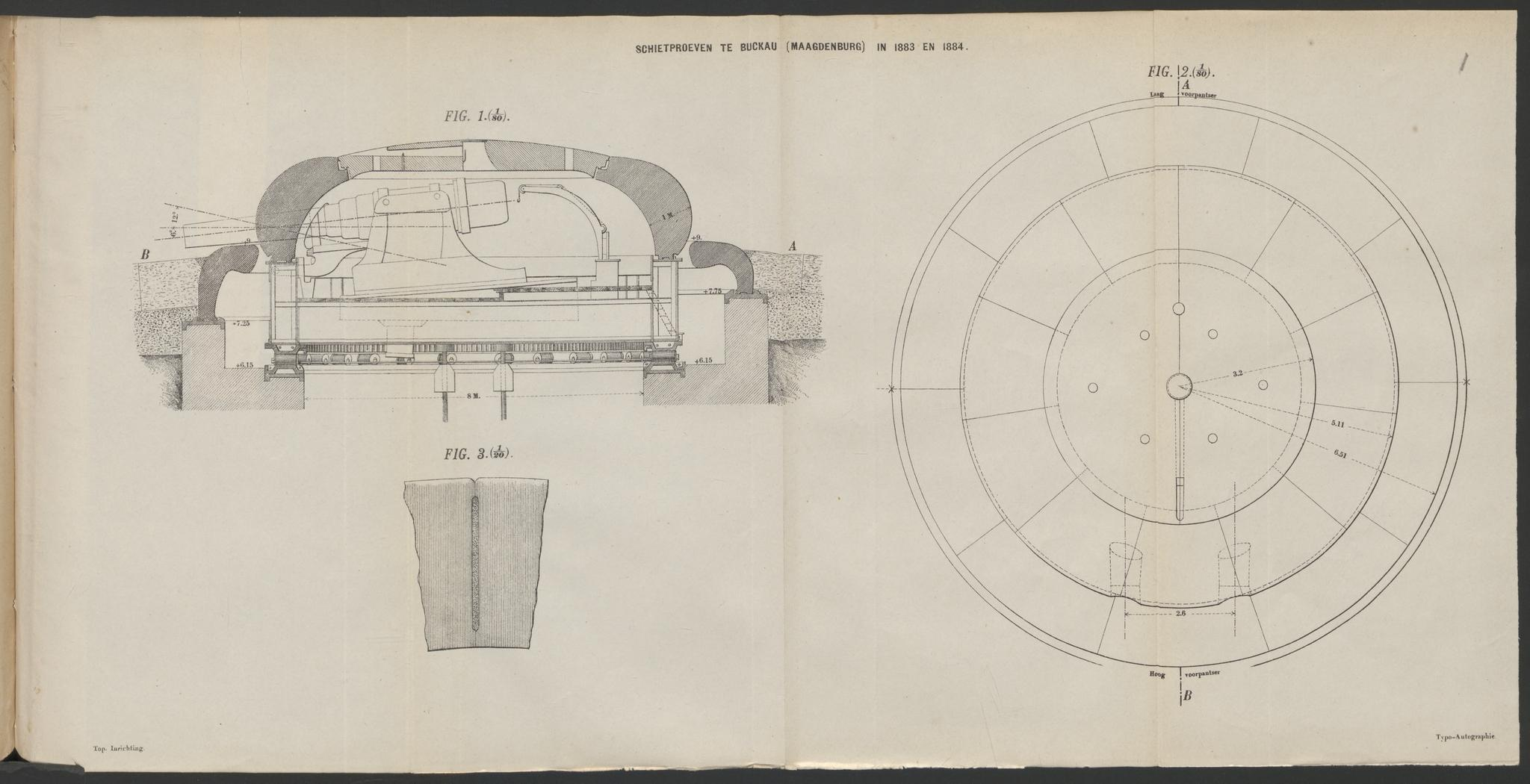
The 30.5 cm L/25 in the cupola of Fort Harssens

In 1879, the Dutch government finally decided to build Fort Harssens at Den Helder. This fortress would have two armored cupolas with two 30.5 cm guns each. Just like the German navy's projected 30.5 cm L/22 Ring Kanone had become the 30.5 cm MRK L/22 when it was finally ordered, the 30.5 cm had even further evolved by the time the Dutch wanted to order the guns for the fortress. This happened in mid-1880.

=== A shortened 30.5 cm L/35 ===
By the time that the Dutch wanted to order their first 30.5 cm MRK L/25, Krupp had switched to the Mantel Ring (jacketed and hooped) construction. Krupp had also introduced longer models, which profited from discoveries in the field of gunpowder. The Dutch government then chose and ordered a gun that was apparently a Krupp catalogue model. It shot a 330 kg projectile which was supposed to have a velocity of 530 m/s, resulting in a Vis viva of 4,745 M.T.

During 1881, Krupp then developed a 30.5 cm gun of 35 calibers length. By changing the grooves, and widening the powder chamber, it was able to use a heavier charge and longer (i.e. heavier) projectiles. The Dutch then opted to wait for the test results of this new model. When these March 1882 tests proved positive, the inner configuration of the only 25 caliber long Dutch gun was changed to get a widened powder chamber and the same grooves as the L/35. This allowed the Dutch gun to fire projectiles that were 3.5 caliber long and weighed 455 kg. (Instead of 2.8 caliber long and weighing 333 kg for the early model)

One can wonder why the Dutch government did not choose the 28 cm MRK L/35 over what was then essentially a shortened 30.5 cm MRK L/35. Due to its higher velocity, the 28 cm MRK L/35 was just as powerful as the 30.5 cm L/25, but more economical in use as it fired a lighter projectile and used less gunpowder. However, the 28 cm's greater length would require the armored cupolas of Harssens to have a diameter that was about 1 m bigger, leading to an extra cost of about 200,000 guilders, annulling all these savings. A further aspect was that heavier projectiles retained more of their vis viva at longer distances. A third aspect was that a longer section of the 28 cm MRK L/35 would stick out of the cupola, increasing the risk that the gun would get knocked out by enemy fire.

=== Technical characteristics ===
The total length of the gun was 7,650 mm, or 7,650/305 = 25 calibers (rounded). The length of bore was 6,720 mm. The rifling consisted of 68 grooves. These were 9.5 mm wide and 1.75 mm deep. The space between the grooves was 4.5 mm wide. The weight of the barrel including the breech piece was 38,000 kg.

The widened powder chamber of the Dutch version had a length of 1,136 mm and a diameter of 350 mm. Its size can be estimated as π(350/2)^{2} * 1,136 = 109.30 dm^{3}. However, the length of the normal burning space (normale verbrandruimte) was longer at 1,490 mm for the projectiles in use in 1883. The difference with the early model (943 mm long with a diameter of 311 mm, see above) explains how the Dutch version could use a far higher charge.

The gun fired a 3.5 caliber long pantsergranaat of chilled wrought steel grenade, weighing 455 kg and carrying 10 kg of explosives.

The regular grenade was a 4 caliber long gewone granaat of cast iron, weighing 455 kg and carrying 18 kg of explosives.

In 1882 the Dutch army was allowed to test several kinds of gunpowder using the Krupp 30.5 cm L/35. It also tried gunpowder made in the Netherlands, but this proved far less effective than the prismatic gunpowder that had been made available by Krupp.

During tests in 1882, a Dutch gunpowder manufacturer from Muiden provided a gunpowder that was not nearly as good as that which some German manufacturers made, but was of acceptable quality, However, when the gunpwoder factory exploded in Januar 1883, the order for gunpowder went to the Pulverfabrik Düneberg near Geesthacht. On 1 June 1883, a contract was signed for the delivery of 70,000 kg of brown prismatic gunpowder. In the second half of 1883, the Dutch then tested the gun and gunpowder at the shooting range in Meppen. With a charge of 120 kg, the velocity was 467 m/s. The average pressure in the gun was 2,370 Atm. A second test in June 1884 yielded almost identical results.

== The 30.5 cm MRK L/25 c/80's ==
In general, Krupp quickly went on to make ever longer guns. As explained above, the 28 cm MRK L/35 was just as effective as a 25 caliber long 30.5 cm gun, but cheaper in use. It is therefore quite possible that the 30.5 cm MRK L/25 c/80 light, and the 30.5 cm MRK L/25 c/80 heavy were only a design in a catalogue.

For armored fortress cupolas, a heavy but relatively short gun might still have been a sensible option after 1880. It might be that Krupp therefore continued to offer a short version of its 30.5 cm MRK L/35.
