= 30.5 cm RK L/22 =

1876 Krupp rifled breach loader gun

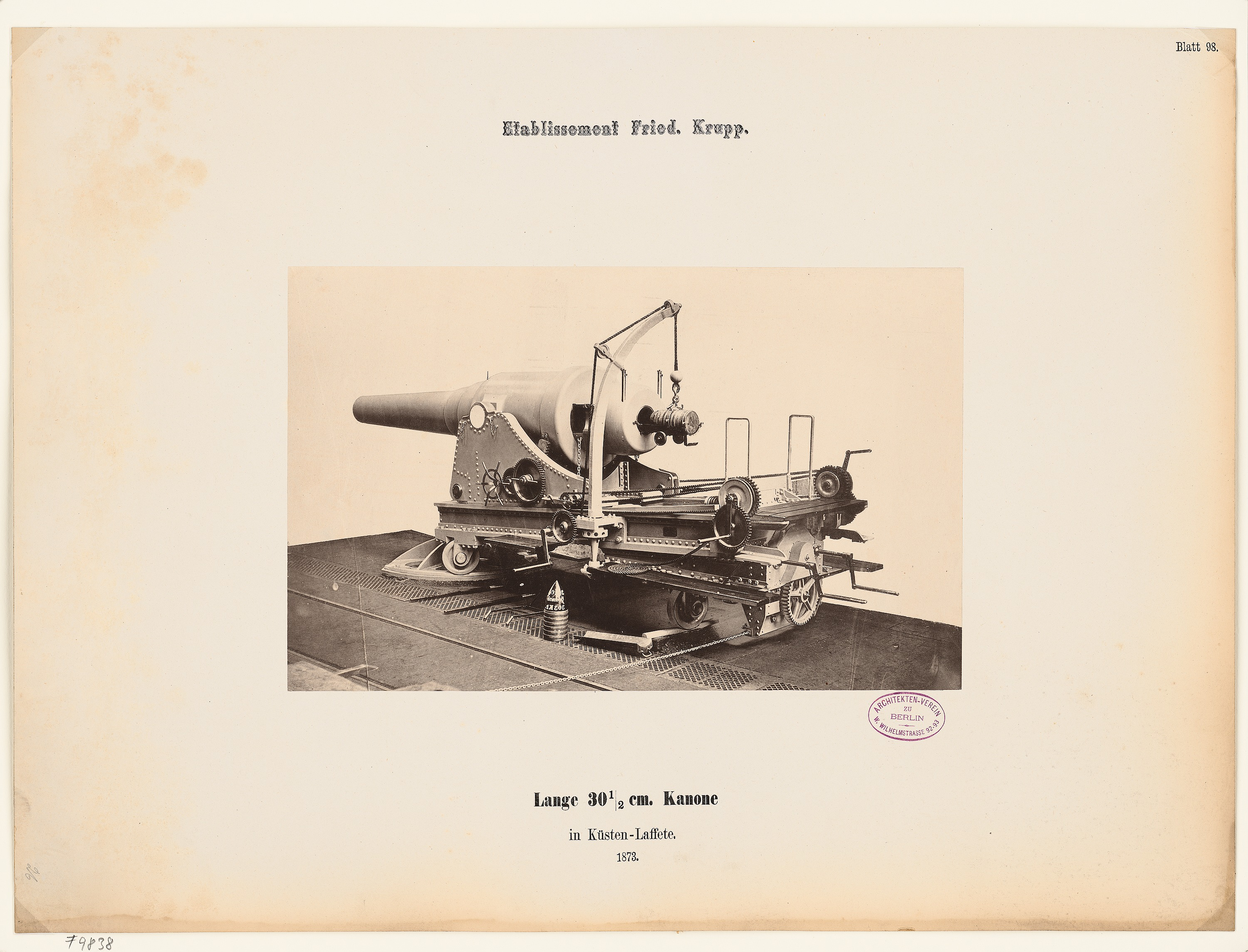
- 30.5 cm RK L/22 in 1873
- Type: Coastal Artillery
- Place of origin: Germany

Service history
- Used by: Imperial German Navy for tests

Production history
- Designer: Krupp
- Designed: 1872
- Manufacturer: Krupp
- Produced: 1872

Specifications
- Mass: 36,600 kg
- Length: 6,700 mm
- Caliber: 305 mm
- Breech: horizontal sliding wedge
- Muzzle velocity: 1873: 459 m/s

The 30.5 cm Ring Kanone L/22 was a 30.5 cm 22 caliber long Krupp Ring Kanone. It was a rifled breech loader built-up gun with a Krupp cylindroprismatic horizontal sliding breech. The gun became famous when it was exhibited at the 1873 Vienna World's Fair. It did not enter service, but did lead to the development of the 30.5 cm MRK L/22.

== Context ==
=== Background: Heavier armor on ships ===
In mid 1872 and May 1873, the German military held trials with what was then its heaviest gun, the 28 cm RK L/22. In an August 1873 note about the May 1873 trials, the Artillerie Prüfungskommission (artillery test commission) noted that the 28 cm gun would not be strong enough in the near future.

At the time, some new ships had armor belts of 305 mm thickness with a supporting layer that was even stronger than the 18 in (457 mm) of teak found on Warrior. Other ships like Petr Veliky and a new British class were partly protected by 355 mm armor. These developments meant that in order to assure the superiority of the coastal artillery over ship armor, a heavier caliber than 28 cm was necessary.

== Development of the 30.5 cm RK L/22 ==
=== The Vienna gun ===
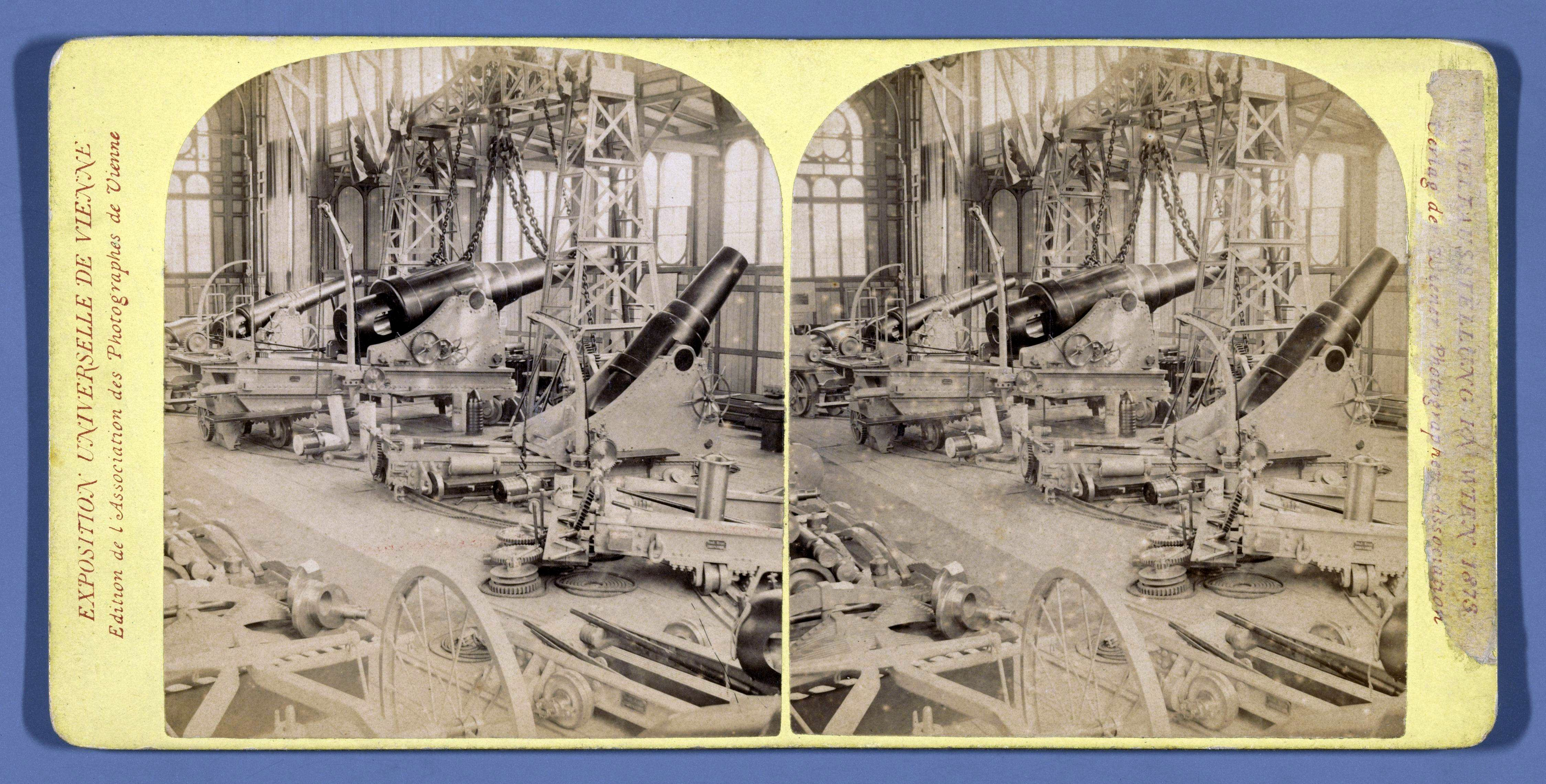
The 30.5 cm RK L/22 as showpiece on the Vienna fair

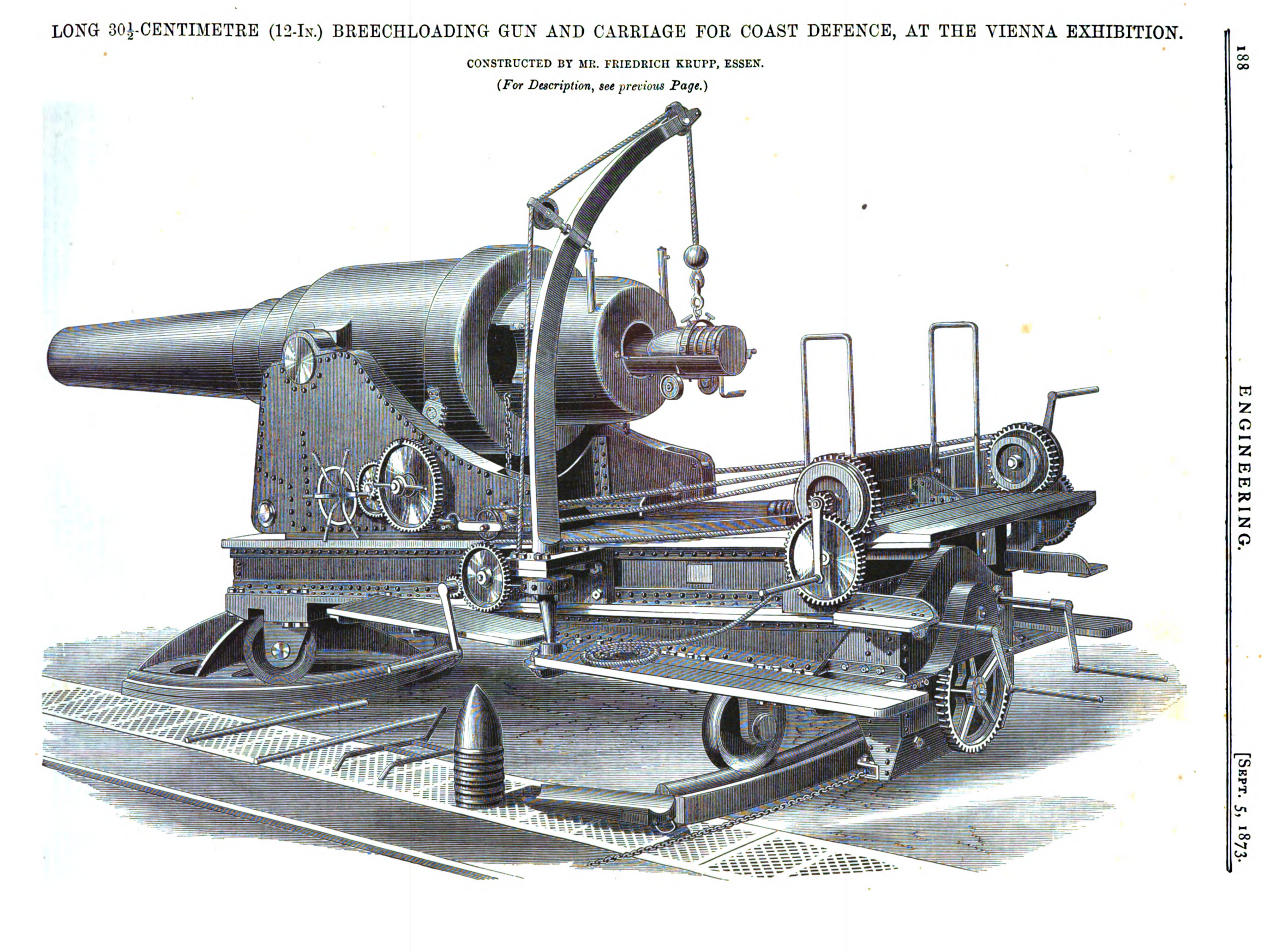
30.5 cm RK L/22 in Vienna

While the German authorities were making plans, the Krupp steelworks pro-actively developed the 30.5 cm Ring Kanone L/22 to counter prospective advances in ship armor. Krupp initially made two of these guns. One of these guns was used for testing.

The other 30.5 cm gun was the showpiece of the Krupp pavilion on the 1 May to 31 October 1873 Vienna World's Fair. The 30.5 cm L/22 gun got extensive media coverage by its appearance on the Vienna fair. Multiple military delegations visited the fair and made reports about the gun. An extensive report with images was written by the Dutch captain A.M. Mazel.

The test gun was called 'gezogene 30,5 cm Kanone Nr. 1'. From 7 August 1872 to mid February 1873 it fired 230 shot.

=== Germany considers the 30.5 cm RK L/22 ===
In February 1874 the German government appointed a commission to investigate the situation on the North Sea and Baltic coast. The commission concluded that for the North Sea a heavier caliber gun than 28 cm was not necessary for most places and not enough in other places. On the Baltic coast, it found that a heavier gun could be useful, but that it was probably more efficient to invest in torpedoes and monitors.

Also in 1874, the German Admiralty considered the possibility of arming the projected Ausfallschiffe (small battleships for home waters) with the 30.5 cm Ring Kanone that Krupp had made in 1873. In 1874 Germany then ordered three 30.5 cm RK L/22 at Krupp.

Krupp then offered a gun for a test against armor that took place on 7 July 1875. The target of the 1875 test was an iron armor plate of 10 inch backed up by a teak and then followed by a 6-inch armor plate backed by another layer of teak. Three shots were fired with 60 kg of prismatic pulver with a density of 1.74-1.76, two of these failed to penetrate the armor. The third shot only succeeded because it hit a spot that had been weakened by earlier hits. Two more shots were fired with 65 kg of gunpowder. These attained a velocity of about 460 m/s, or about 15 m/s higher than those fired with 60 kg of propellant. These shots easily penetrated the target.

During the Winter of 1875/76 Krupp tested the gun with a charge of 65 kg of Prismatic Pulver c/75. It fired a 301 kg projectile with a velocity of 461 m/s. A kg of gunpowder then had 1,170 cm^{3} of space to explode in. The average gas pressure was 2,890 atm.

=== Labels of the 30.5 cm L/22 guns ===
Krupp referred to the 30.5 cm Ring Kanone as the 'Lange 30.5 cm Kanone' (see 30.5 cm RK L/22 in 1873 image). This was in line with Krupp's idea to have long (L/22) and short (L/20) versions of his guns. After the German navy had taken the 30.5 cm MRK L/22 into use, it had only one kind of 30.5 cm gun in service, and so it simply named the MRK the '30.5 cm Kanone'. When in 1885, the navy changed its naming system to include the length of its guns in calibers, this became the '30.5 cm Kanone L/22'. The 30.5 cm RK L/22 guns that Germany bought did not get an official label, because they were not adopted for service. If they had been, their label would probably have become 30.5 cm RK L/22 in 1885.

== Characteristics of the Vienna gun ==
=== Overview ===
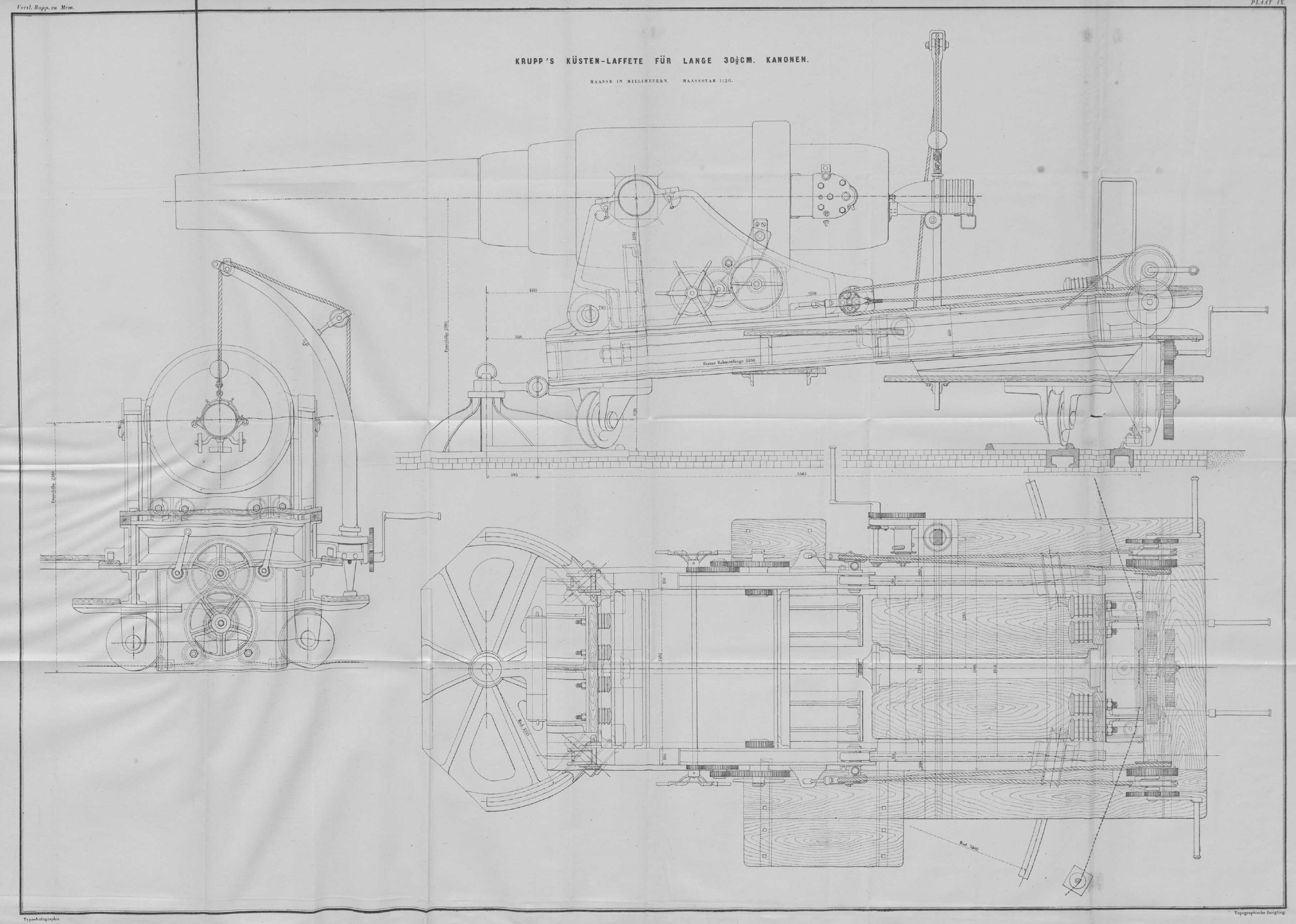
Sketch of the RK L/22

The 30.5 cm RK L/22 was made according to the Ring Kanone system. It consisted of an inner tube and three layers of rings put on top of each other. One of the rings included the trunnions. Total length was 6,7 m or 22 calibers. The length of bore was 5.77 m. The length of the rifled part was 4.39 m. The total weight was 36,600 kg (i.e. 36 ton). Charges were 50 or 60 kg of prismatic gunpowder. The report of the test gave some further details.

The gun had 72 parallel grooves with a twist length of 21.79 m. The grooves were 8.8 mm wide, the lands 4.5 mm wide. The grooves were 3.5 mm deep. The deep grooves were a feature of the old rifling system that would be abandoned by Germany.

=== Projectiles ===
The Vienna gun still had the old projectiles with lead driving bands. The projectiles were 760 mm long. The steel grenade with 7 kg of explosives weighed 296 kg. The hardened grenade weighed 303 kg and contained 3.3 kg of explosives. Finally, the long grenade weighed 270 kg and contained 14.8 kg of explosives.

=== Carriage ===
The Vienna gun was exhibited on a coastal carriage. The total carriage weight was 21,000 kg. A conspicuous feature of the gun and carriage was that they were so well balanced. From a physical perspective, two men could operate the gun. However, for an efficient rate of fire, about 10 men were needed.

== Later characteristics ==
When Germany ordered three 30.5 cm L/22 guns, these were made with a different inner configuration than that of the Vienna gun. The use of copper driving bands required shallower grooves. In an overview of German Artillery, there indeed appears a 30.5 cm gun with a diameter of 309 mm in the grooves, i.e. with 2 mm deep grooves like the later MRK had. That this was indeed one of the guns ordered in 1874 was shown by the charge of 60 kg of Prismatic Pulver with a density of 1.73-1.76. Just like that used in the July 1875 test.

This variant of the gun had an overall length of 6,700 mm. The length of bore was 5,770 mm, and the length of the rifled part was 4,750 mm. The diameter of the chamber was 313 mm. The gun had 72 grooves that were 8.8 mm wide. The lands were 4.5 mm wide. The twist length was 13.725 m. Weight was 36,600 kg. The standard charge was 60 kg of P.P. with a density of 1.73-1.76.

== Usage ==
To all appearances, the 30.5 cm RK L/22 was never put into service. However, it might have been used to test the gun emplacement / turn table on board the armored gunboat Wespe, see the page about the 30.5 cm MRK L/22.

== Further developments ==
The 30.5 cm RK L/22 was succeeded by the 30.5 cm MRK L/22. This was caused by the introduction of the Mantel Ring construction, known in English as jacketed and hooped. This made for a significantly stronger gun barrel and led to all kinds of other innovations.
