= 30.5 cm MRK L/22 =

1876 Krupp rifled breach loader gun

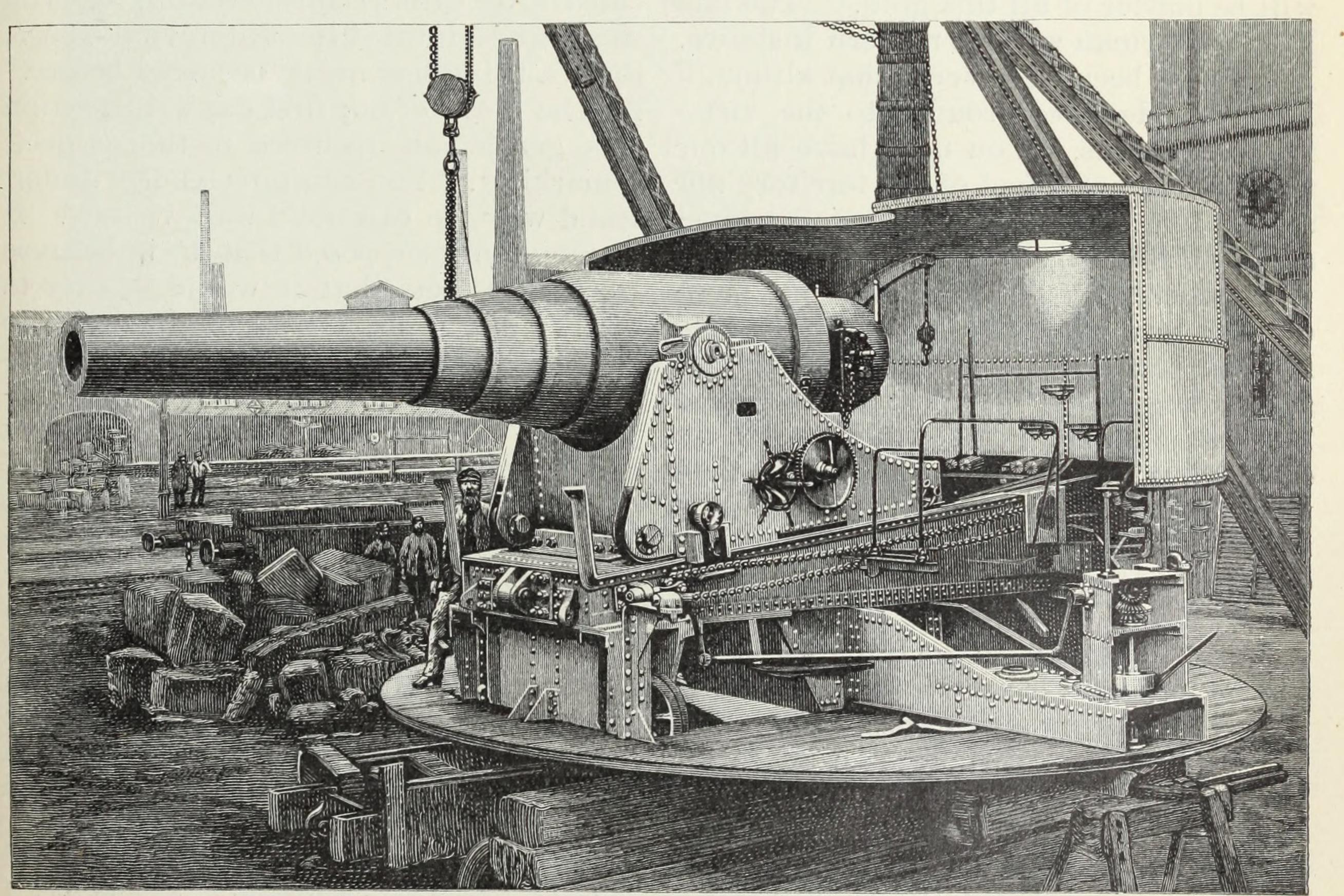
- 30.5 cm MRK L/22 engraving after a photograph.
- Type: Naval artillery
- Place of origin: Germany

Service history
- Used by: Imperial German Navy; Royal Danish Navy

Production history
- Designer: Krupp
- Designed: 1876
- Manufacturer: Krupp
- Produced: 1876

Specifications
- Mass: 35,600 kg
- Length: 6,700 mm
- Caliber: 305 mm
- Breech: horizontal sliding wedge
- Muzzle velocity: 488 m/s as first used; 522 m/s in the 1880s.; Danish: 510.6 m/s

The 30.5 cm Mantel Ring Kanone L/22 was a 30.5 cm 22 caliber long Krupp Mantel Ring Kanone (MRK). It was a rifled breech loader built-up gun with a Krupp cylindroprismatic sliding breech. It was a further development of the earlier 30.5 cm RK L/22 that Krupp had developed and exhibited at the 1873 Vienna World's Fair.

== Background ==
In 1873, the German Navy concluded that for the coastal artillery, it would require a heavier gun than the existing 28 cm RK L/22. Meanwhile, Krupp had developed the 30.5 cm RK L/22. In 1874 authorities then ordered three guns, but dropped the plan to use them as coastal artillery. They now began to consider the gun for use on small battle ships. This plan was also not realized and by the time they finally decided to use the gun, it was outdated by the new Mantel Ring construction.

=== RK vs MRK ===
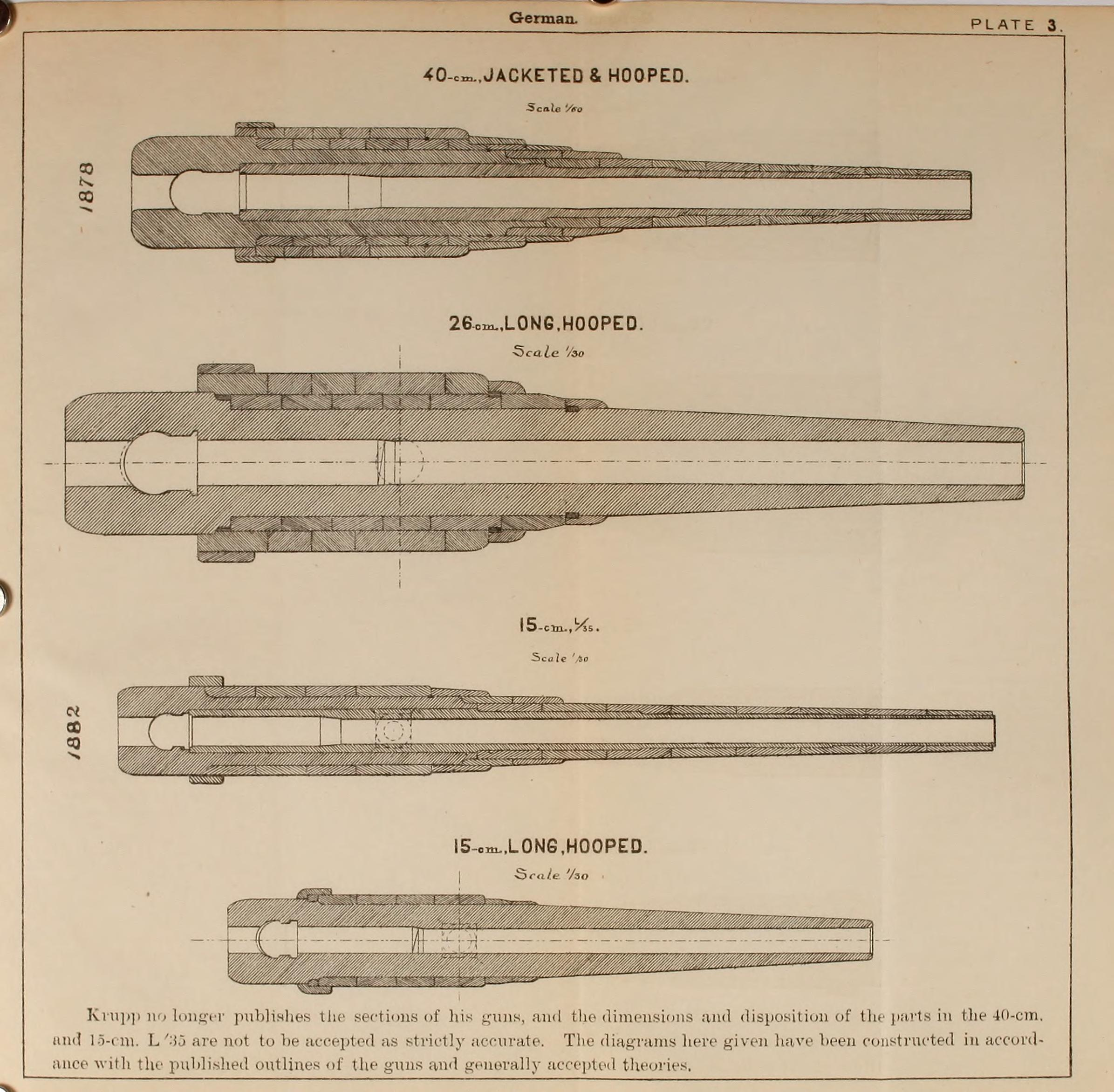
Krupp hooped (RK) vs. jacketed and hooped (MRK)

The first 30.5 cm gun of 22 caliber length was a Ring Kanone (RK), it was succeeded by the Mantel Ring Kanone (MRK). Both had a built-up gun gun barrel. The older Ring Kanone (RK) construction, consisted of an inner tube and one or more layers of hoops (Ringe). In English, it was also referred to as a hooped gun. The later Mantel Ring Kanone (MRK) construction was also known as jacketed and hooped. It consisted of a thin inner tube that was surrounded by a thick jacket Mantel which contained the wedge slot, the jacket was again surrounded by the layers of hoops.

The trick of the jacketed and hooped construction was that the jacket was shrunk upon the inner tube, pre-pressurizing it. This allowed higher peak pressures inside the barrel. These could be achieved by diminishing the amount of space that the gunpowder had to explode in, the Verbrennungsraum. This was measured in cm^{3} per kg of gunpowder. On average the Mantel Ring construction was about 20% stronger than the earlier Ring construction.

=== Recognition of the MRK L/22 ===
Pictures of 30.5 cm MRK gun on board the Wespe class and that on board the Danish ironclad HDMS Helgoland as well as photos of Helgoland's tower, show a gun that, counting from the muzzle, has four notable sharp increases in outer diameter before the trunnions. Photos and the design drawing of the Vienna 30.5 cm MRK gun show only three such sharp increases.

=== Labels of the 30.5 cm MRK L/22 gun ===
When the German navy took our Mantel Ring Kanone 30.5 cm L/22 into use, it had only one kind of 30.5 cm gun, and so it simply named it the '30.5 cm Kanone'. When in 1885, the navy changed its naming system to include the length of its guns in calibers, this became the '30.5 cm Kanone L/22'. The two 'Vienna' guns did not get an official label, because they were not adopted for service. If they had been, their label would probably have become 30.5 cm RK L/22 in 1885.

== Development of the 30.5 cm MRK L/22 ==
=== The first 30.5 cm MRK L/22 is ordered ===
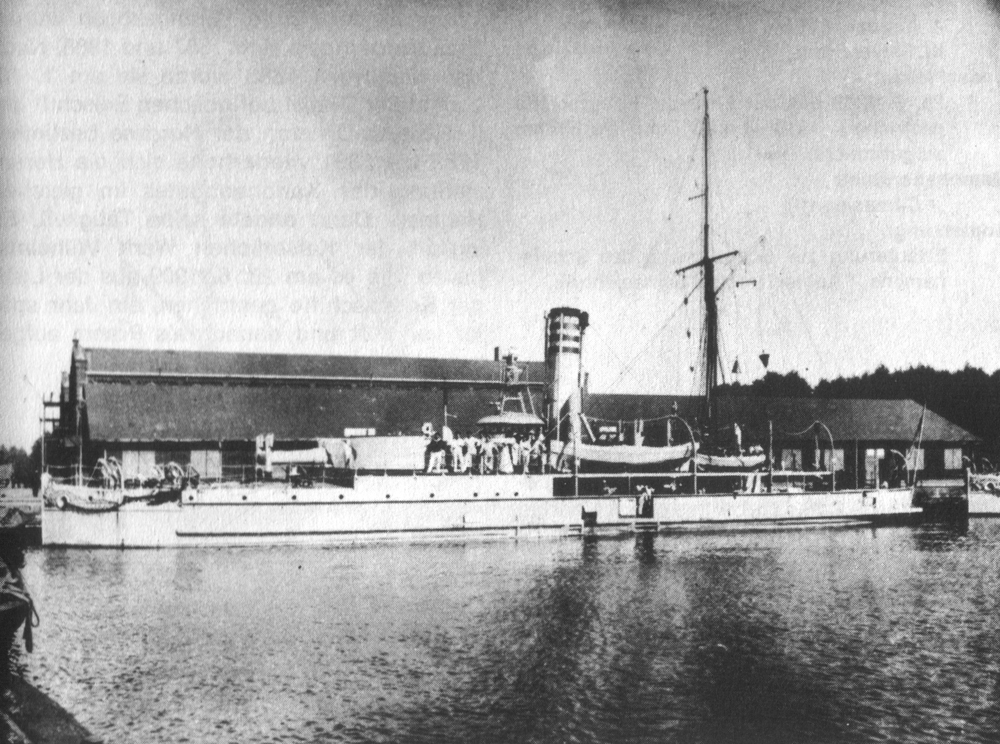
The armored gunboat SMS Natter of the Wespe class was armed with the 30.5 cm L/22

In August 1876 the Admiralty ordered that the projected armored gunboats (The later Wespe class) would each be armed with a single 30.5 cm gun. It urged the Artillerie Prüfungskommission (artillery test commission) to take a decision on the final inner construction (i.e. the rifling) of the gun. In October 1876, the artillery test commission proposed 60 or even better, 72 grooves of 2 mm depth, a twist length 45 caliber, a diameter of the powder chamber of 313 mm, a diameter of the rifled shot chamber 307 mm in the lands and 309 mm in the grooves, and a standard charge of 75 kg of prismatic gunpowder c/75.

In 1875 Krupp had started to apply the new Mantel Ring Kanone construction for guns. This consisted of first placing a mantle over the inner tube before applying the rings. This made for an even stronger gun barrel than the Ring Kanone. It also led to the MRK abbreviation for Mantel Ring Kanone. In view of the proposed charge of 75 kg of prismatic gunpowder, the artillery test commission already took the MRK construction into account when it made its proposal for the new 30.5 cm gun. In November 1876 the admiralty then ordered a single 30.5 cm MRK barrel.

The authorities were divided about the desirable size of the chamber, in particular about how much room the gunpowder would have to explode in (Verbrennungsraum). This was relevant, because (in principle) less room gave more thrust, but could also lead to such a high peak pressure that the gun could be damaged or even burst. In an initial test with a charge of 72 kg, the atmospheric pressure was about 3,000 atm. Well below the 3,500 atm that Krupp thought admissible. It was then determined that with that charge, the room for the gunpowder to explode in would be 1,030 cm^{3} per kg of gunpowder.

=== The disappointing tests ===
The new 30.5 cm Mantel Ring Kanone was then tested. In June and September 1877 barrel No. 1 was tested on the artillery range of Kummersdorf, near Berlin. Barrel No. 2 was first tested in Essen in December 1877. The results were disappointing. It was found that at a charge of 72 kg, the atmospheric pressure inside the gun was higher than had been measured earlier. The tests also led to jamming of the breech and repeated damage to the carriage and emplacement.

After the breech had been repaired, the admiralty ordered tests to establish the ballistic tables for firing hardened iron and regular grenades with 72 kg of gunpowder. A new stronger breech was introduced and gun No 1 was test-fired at Kummersdorf till the fall of 1878.

Charges were from 72 till 74.5 kg, which resulted in average pressures of 3,200 to 3,400 atm, dangerously close to the maximum pressure. In total, gun No.1 fired 167 shots of which 119 with the new breech. After that, barrel and breech did not show significant changes. Six projectiles burst inside the barrel. The commission that tested the gun was not satisfied. It noted that with the measured pressures, the only option for the charge was to use the less explosive gunpowder that had been used in the tests. One of its members voiced his opinion that the powder chamber should be widened for a charge of 78–80 kg with a space of 1,200 cm^{3} per kg and a maximum pressure of 2,800 Atm.

On 29 April 1879 Krupp advised the admiralty about the charge and possible changes of the 30,5 cm gun. One option was to expand the space for gunpowder to explode in to 1,150 cm^{3} per kg of gunpowder in combination with increased charge of 80 kg. Another option was a charge of 120 kg with a room of 1,250 cm^{3} per kg of gunpowder. Krupp advised to await the outcome of further experiments before changing the gun.

=== Tests on board Wespe ===
In February 1877, a 30.5 cm Kanone L/22 was placed on board SMS Wespe. The gun weighed 36,729 kg, its carriage 25,000 kg. It was noted to be as powerful as the British 80 ton gun, but more accurate. Wespe was to perform shooting trials with the 30.5 cm gun. It was said that if these were positive for the ship, there were plans to arm her with a 32 cm gun.

On 26 March 1877, these shooting trials with the "32 cm gun" were reported to have met all expectations. The entirely new Krupp designed pivot carriage and turn installation was found to be excellent. Gun and carriage together weighed 1,200 Zentner or 60,000 kg. The only trouble was that the enormous pressure of the gasses that exited the muzzle caused significant damage to the deck in front of the gun.

These reports show some inconsistencies with other data. The 30.5 cm MRK barrel No. 1 which was tested in Kummersdorf in June and September 1877 was said to weigh 35,600 kg. The gun on board Wespe was said to weigh 36,729 kg. It also seems odd that if the first MRK was ordered in November 1877, it was test fired at sea in March 1877.

=== The 30.5 cm MRK L/22 of 1878 ===
The first Wespe class armored gunboat was launched in 1876, and the last was launched in 1881. We know that in 1878, there was actually a 30.5 cm Krupp gun in German service. Therefore, there can be little doubt that a design identical or very similar to the first 30.5 cm MRK L/22 was adopted to arm the Wespe class. This is confirmed by an 1889 statement that the 30.5 cm MRK L/22 was designed in about 1876.

== Characteristics of the German Navy version ==
=== Overview ===
In its early configuration, the 30.5 cm MRK L/22, was mentioned as 'Deutsche 30.5 cm Mantel Ringkanone. The gun was 6,700 mm or 22 calibers long. It weighed 36,600 kg. It fired a hardened iron shell of 325 kg by using a charge of 72 kg. Initial velocity was 488 m/s. This is all in line with the data about the tests of the 30.5 cm MRK L/22 prototype, except for the gun's weight.

=== Weight ===
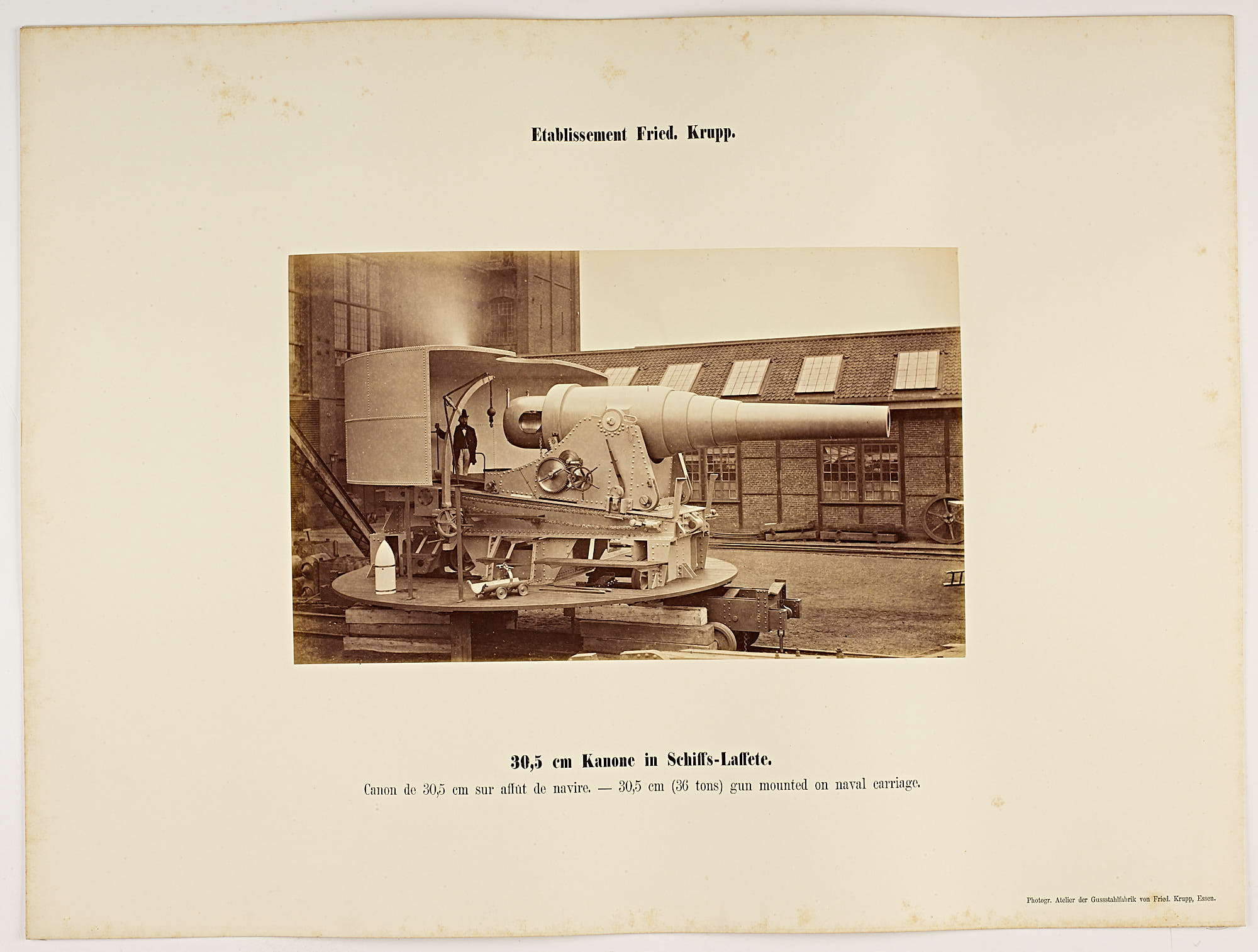
30.5 cm MRK L/22 on ship carriage with turret armor

The indications of the weight of the 30.5 cm MRK L/22 are contradictory. Krupp liked to advertise his guns with the weight in English long tons of 1,016.0 kg. This was especially important because English media tended to refer to the caliber and weight of a gun. The weight of 36,600 kg equals 36 long tons. 35,600 kg equals 35 long tons.

In 1885 the weights of the RK and MRK were given as 36.6t for the RK vs. 35.6t for the MRK. Another early mention also had 35,600 kg. The famous annual Brassey's had Wespe's guns weighing 35 long tons (35.6 t) and Helgoland's gun weighing 36 long tons (36.6 t). The latter is supported by the photographs of Helgoland's armored gun turret. These have the English caption: '30,5 cm (36 tons) gun mounted on naval carriage.' The weight in tons was omitted in the German and French captions.

In 1896 the 30.5 cm gun used by the German Navy was reported to weigh 36,000 kg, including a breech piece of 1,340 kg.

=== Gunpowder ===
In order to reduce the strain on gun barrels, there were consistent and successful attempts to produce slower burning gun-powder. At first the Ring Kanone used prismatic gunpowder. Other types were Pellet- and Pebble gunpowder. The original prismatic gunpowder C/68 was first replaced by the denser prismatic gunpowder C/75, which burned slower.

When the C/75 powder was used, the difference with the older RK firing with C/68 powder became more marked. With 72 kg of C/75, the MRK fired a 367.3 kg shot with a speed of 488 m/s, as opposed to 60 kg for a 296 kg shot at a speed of 465 m/s for the older RK.

In turn the gunpwoder C/75 was replaced by the even slower burning brown prismatic gunpowder C/82. This gunpowder made for an increased velocity if longer barrels were used, but also allowed increased velocity or heavier projectiles by using higher charges. The smokeless Würfelpulver C/89 was even more powerful.

=== Carriage ===
The carriage used on board Wespe was the 30,5 cm Pivot-Lafette c/76. This put the trunnions at a height of 2,57 m. It allowed an elevation of 20 degrees and a declination to 7 degrees. Total weight of this carriage was 23,200 kg. An earlier specific mention of the "lafette c/76 of the 30,5 cm MRK" said its weight was about 29,000 kg.

=== Final characteristics of the 30.5 cm MRK L/22 ===
The change of the 30.5 cm MRK L/22 to use the prismatic gunpowder C/82 was effected before 1885. By then, the gun fired with an 88 kg charge. This resulted in a vis viva of 4,450 meterton instead of 3,895 meterton, which was a significant improvement.

In 1889, the 30.5 cm MRK L/22 was specifically mentioned as a gun actually having been in service in 1878. In 1896 it weighed 36,000 kg, including a breech piece of 1,340 kg. The carriage weighed 21,700 kg. The length of bore was 5,770 mm or L/18.9, which is in line with the 1878 situation. The 4,619 mm long rifled part was shorter than the earlier 4,750 mm long rifled part.

The most profound change was that the charge was now 202.8 lb or 92 kg of prismaic pulver C/82, and the shot weighed 725 lb/329 kg. Muzzle velocity was reported as 1,712 feet or 522 m/s.

== Characteristics of the Danish Navy version ==
The 30.5 cm MRK L/22 used by the Danish Navy was a different model from that used by the German Navy. The characteristics were:

- Caliber: 305 mm
- Length: 6,700 mm
- Length of bore: L/18.91 (5,764 mm)
- 68 grooves
- Twist length: L/45 (13.73 m)
- Weight: 36t
- Upper carriage: 6.4t
- Carriage frame (Rahmen): 22.9t
- Projectiles: 329 kg
- Charge: 81.75 kg
- Velocity: 510.6 m/s

== Usage ==
=== German Navy ===
In the German Navy, the 30.5 cm MRK L/22 was used to arm the 11 armored gunboats of the Wespe class. Even in the late 1890s, it was marked as the strongest gun of the German navy. This was true for the weight of the shot, but the longer 28 cm guns were definitely more powerful.

=== Danish Navy ===
In the Danish Navy, the 30.5 cm MRK L/22 was used on board HDMS Helgoland.

== Further development ==
The 30.5 cm MRK L/22 was succeeded by the 30.5 cm MRK L/25. The first L/25 seems to have been designed by simply making the L/22 a bit longer. It attracted only a few customers. The 30.5 cm MRK L/35 was far more successful. It was part of a series of Krupp guns that introduced much longer barrels and longer projectiles. This was needed to fully profit from the concept of using an even higher charge of even slower-burning gunpowder, leading to a far higher muzzle velocity. This concept was introduced when the few L/25's that were on order were not yet ready, and so these were changed to also use an increased charge and longer projectiles.
