= 24 cm MRK L/30 =

German naval gun

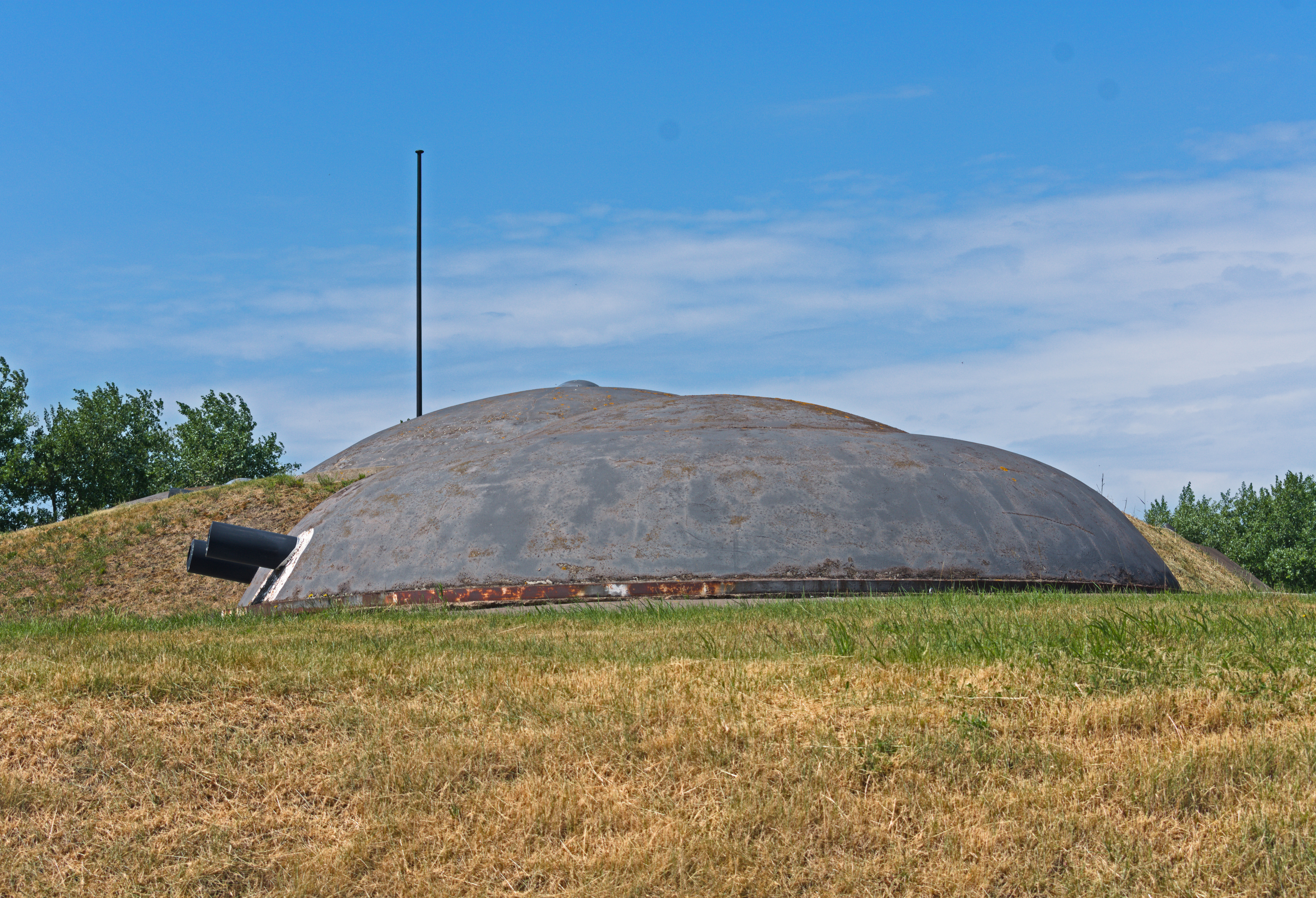
- Reconstructed armored cupola with 24 cm MRK L/30 at nl:Fort aan den Hoek van Holland
- Type: Naval gun Coastal artillery
- Place of origin: German Empire

Service history
- In service: 1885-1945
- Used by: Netherlands; Germany
- Wars: World War I World War II

Production history
- Designer: Krupp
- Designed: 1880
- Manufacturer: Krupp
- Produced: 1884
- No. built: 9 (at least)

Specifications
- Mass: 19,000 kg
- Length: 7,200 mm (L/30)
- Shell: Separate loading bagged charges and projectiles
- Caliber: 240 mm (9.4 in)
- Breech: Cylindro-prismatic breech block
- Muzzle velocity: 549 m/s
- Effective firing range: 7,600 m

The 24 cm MRK L/30 was a Krupp naval gun developed in the early 1880s. Together with the 24 cm K L/35, it implemented the ideas of using higher charges and longer projectiles for the Krupp 24 cm caliber.

== Context ==
=== The 24 cm RK L/22 ===
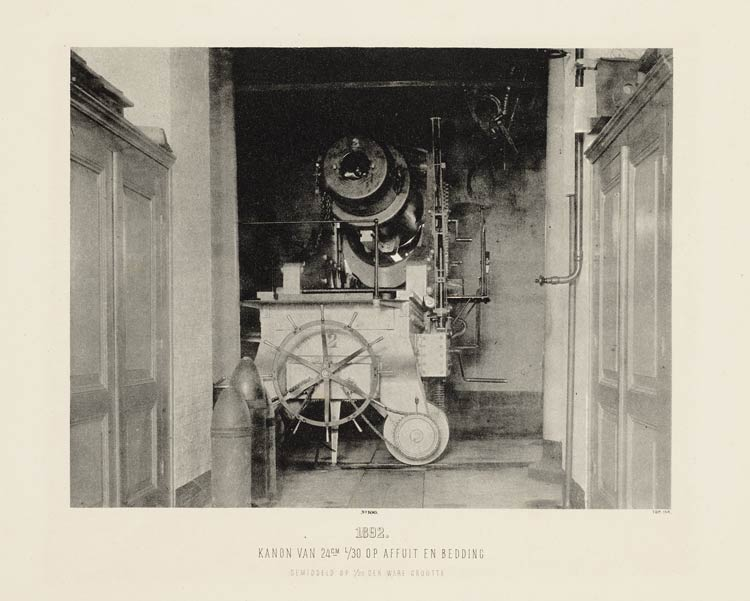
A 24 cm MRK L/30 in position at Fort IJmuiden

When the North German Federal Navy began to form in the late 1860s, it chose the 24 cm RK L/20 as a gun for its armored frigates. As regards coastal defense, the army had some 24 cm RK L/22 built, but decided that the 24 cm caliber was not suitable for coastal defense. However, Turkey bought 50 24 cm RK L/22 guns, and so this gun became a commercial success as a coastal defence gun.

=== The 24 cm MRK L/25 ===
The first major changes to the 24 cm RK L/22 came with the 24 cm MRK L/25. This gun was first tested in December 1875 as a L/22 gun with a caliber of 240 mm instead of 235.4 mm. It also used a charge that was about 60% higher. Other innovations of this gun were heavier projectiles and projectiles that used copper driving bands. In all probability, this gun was already a Mantel Ring Kanone, i.e. hooped and jacketed instead of only hooped like a Ring Kanone (RK). Even the prototype of this gun was thought to be 40% more powerful than the original 24 cm RK L/22.

=== The 24 cm MRK L/25.5 ===
The 24 cm MRK L/25.5 was only a prototype. Together with the 15 cm MRK L/28, Krupp used it to apply discoveries that allowed a way higher charge. In a December 1878 test, the charge was 78 kg of gunpowder, double that of the L/25. The result was a spectacular performance improvement, as the 160.5 kg grenade was now propelled to a velocity of 583 m/s instead of only 473 m/s for the L/25.

During an August 1879 tests the 24 cm MRK L/25.5 was fired at an armored target of about 50 centimeters of wrought iron. The very first shot went straight through as did the second. It gave grounds to claim that the L/25.5 prototype was more effective against armor than all other guns up to and including the 32 cm / 12.5 inch caliber. This would further increase when the longer 215 kg steel grenade became available.

=== Construction C/80 ===
The tests with smaller caliber long guns, the 15 cm MRK L/28, the 24 cm L25/5, the 35.5 cm MRK L/25 and the 40 cm MRK L/25 led Krupp to design a whole new series of longer 30 and 35 caliber long guns, the so-called C/80 system. It meant that the characteristics of 24 cm guns of 30 and 35 caliber length had been calculated.

== The 24 cm MRK L/30 ==
=== Ordering ===
The C/80 design of the 24 cm MRK L/30 called for a gun of 240 mm caliber with a length of bore of 6,480 mm, and a weight of 19,000 kg. It was to fire a steel grenade of 160 kg with a charge of 65 kg. Obviously, this first C/80 calculation did not take the new longer projectiles into account. This is remarkable, because by 1880 a 215 kg steel grenade had already been projected and tested for the 24 cm L/25.5.

For some time, the whole C/80 system was only a set of calculations. The first L/30 gun that Krupp made, the 15.24 cm MRK L/30, was tested in July 1880. In 1881, a 26 cm MRK L/30 was tested. In 1882 multiple long guns were tested. In March the 30.5 cm MRK L/35 and the 15 cm MRK L/35 were tested. In April a 35.5 cm MRK L/30 was tested, and in June 1882 a 28 cm MRK L/35 followed. In September 1882, a 21 cm MRK L/30 was tested.

=== The Dutch order ===
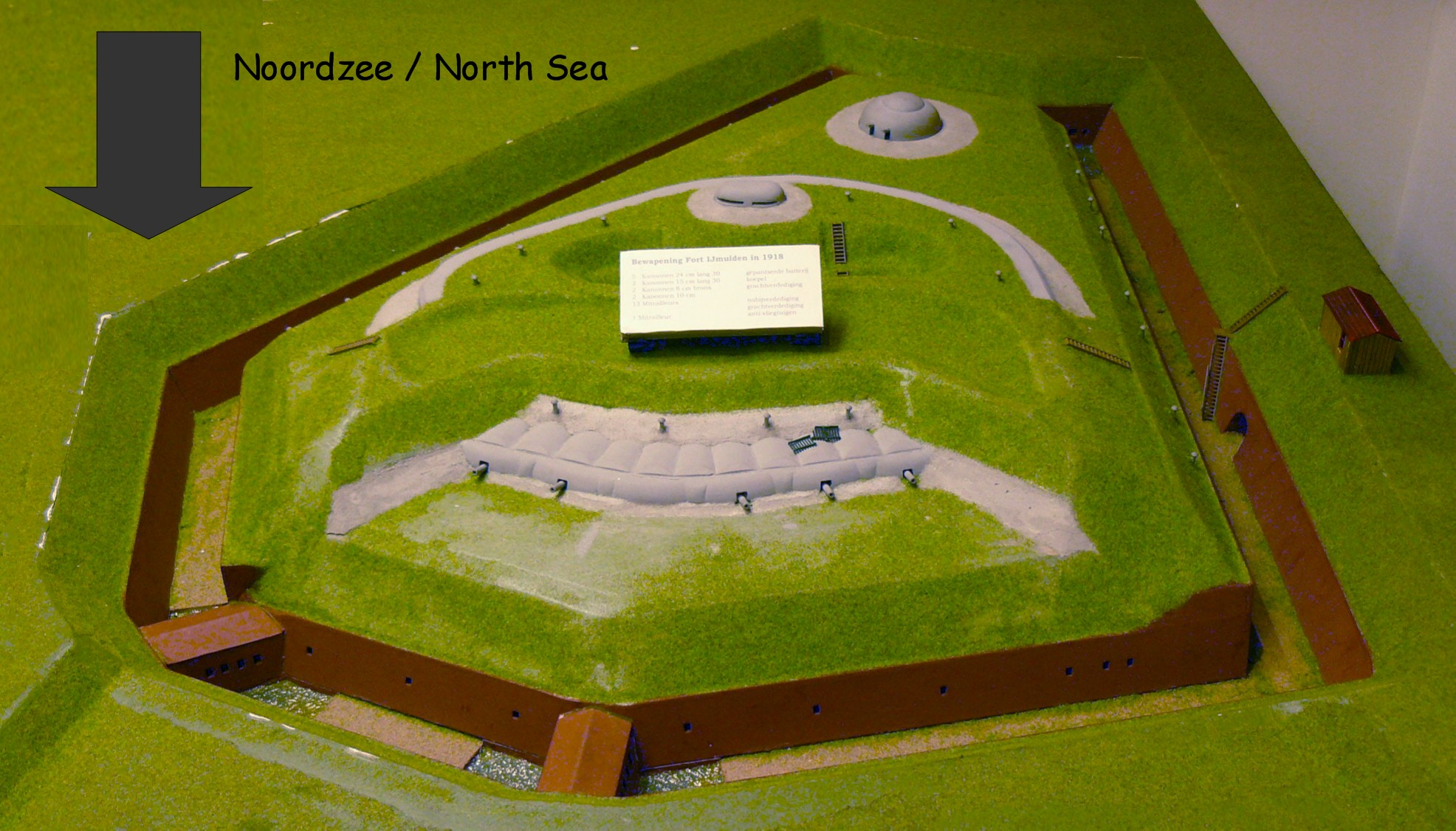
Fort IJmuiden's main battery of 5 24 cm guns

One can suppose that most of the new longer guns were tested because a customer had ordered them. To all appearances, the Dutch government was the launching customer of the 24 cm MRK L/30. In September 1880, the government proposed an 1881 budget law for the completion of the fortifications in the Netherlands. This law determined that Fort IJmuiden would have a battery of 24 cm steel guns behind Gruson armor plating.

As the Dutch already had the 24 cm MRK L/25, it is tempting to think that this gun was meant. However, this is unlikely because the Dutch military press had already shown a keen understanding of the tests with the 24 cm MRK L/25.5. Therefore, it is much more likely that the Dutch government had a 24 cm steel gun with increased charge in mind. This is all the more likely, because the L/25.5 was able to fire the same projectiles that the L/25 fired.

In 1882, the Minister of War Anthonie Reuther asked for budget for the construction of Fort IJmuiden. Part of it would be spent on five guns of 24 cm. The minister explained that in order to increase their effect against ships, these guns would be longer and have a slightly changed inner configuration. This would allow them to fire a 215 kg projectile with a velocity of 500 m/s while the already available guns of the same caliber fired a 161 kg projectile with a velocity of only 475 m/s. The ratio of the vis viva of both guns therefore was 3:2.

The price for the five '24 cm lang 30 kaliber' was 254,000 guilders at 50,800 a piece. The price of five carriages for minimal embrasure was 95,000 guilder, or 19,000 guilders each.

=== Test in Meppen ===
On 9, 10, and 11 December 1884, the 24 cm MRK L/30 was tested in Meppen. The tests were held in the presence of the Dutch artillery officers; Major Soutendam, the captains Moorrees, Scherer, and Rollin Couquerque, and Lieutenant de Fremery. The test would also serve to collect the data for the ballistic tables.

During this test, 3.5 caliber long cast iron grenades of 215 kg were fired using brown prismatic gunpowder made by the Düneberg factory in Hamburg.

== Characteristics ==
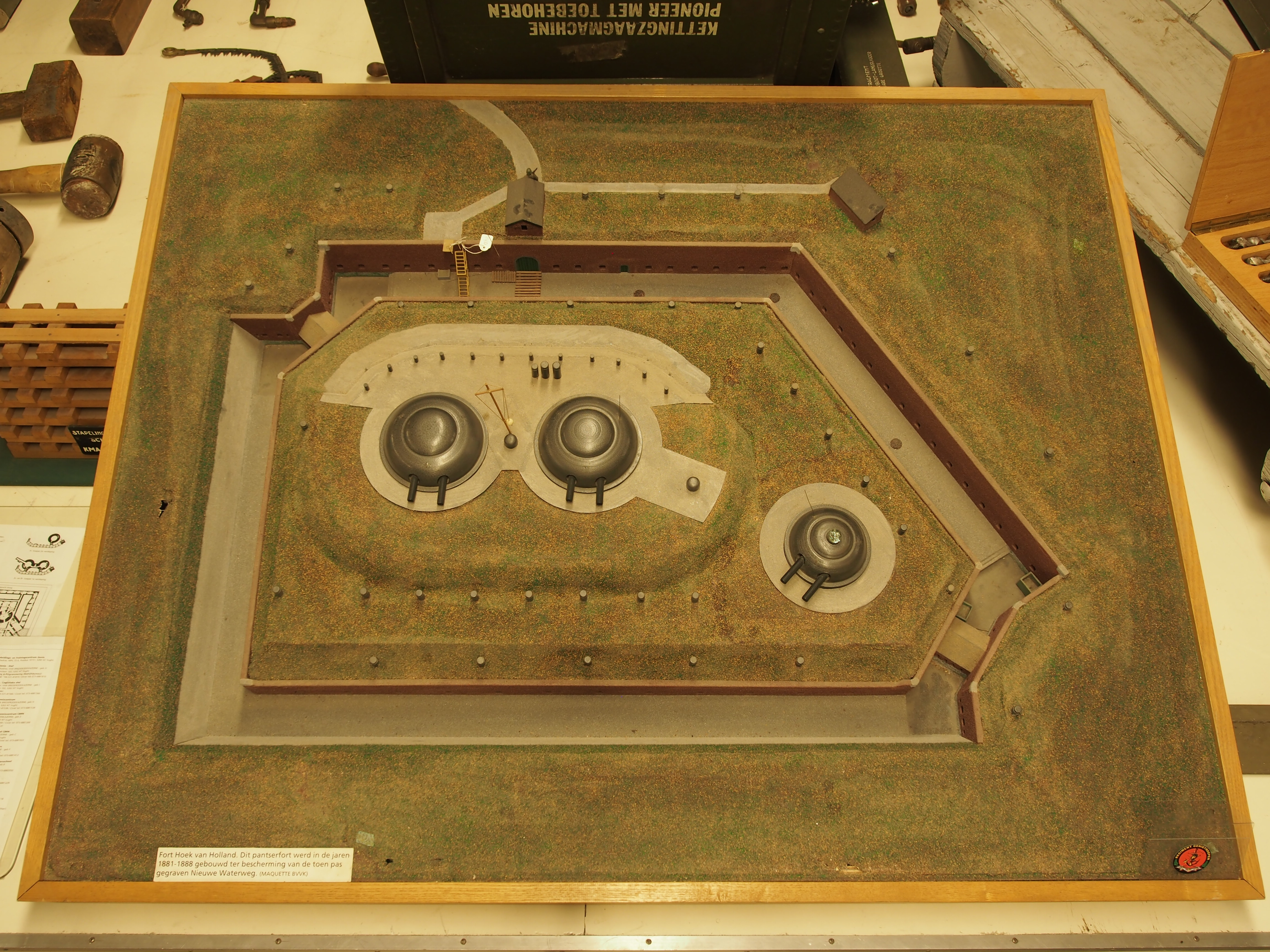
Model of Fort aan den Hoek van Holland

The barrel of the gun had a caliber of 240 mm. Its total length was 7200 mm with a length of bore of 6,487 mm. The total weight was 19,000 kg including the breech of 690 kg. The barrel had 56 grooves with a depth of 1.5 mm.

The steel grenades weighed 215 kg. The regular charge was 68 kg of brown prismatic gunpowder. It gave the projectile a velocity of 529 m/s at a gas pressure of 2,220 to 2,500 atm. The heavy charge of 72 kg gave a velocity of 549 m/s with pressures of 2,460 to 2,625 atm. With the latter, at the muzzle a wrought iron plate of 55 cm would be penetrated. At 2,000 m, 43 cm of wrought iron would be penetrated.

With the regular charge of 68 kg, projectiles were fired to distances ranging between 2,026 m and 7,600 m. At the former, the elevation was 2°19' degrees, for the latter this was 12°5'. For the increased charge, the distances went up to 7,305 m, elevations then ranged between 2°9' and 10°35', thus firing at a flatter trajectory.

== Use ==
=== Germany ===
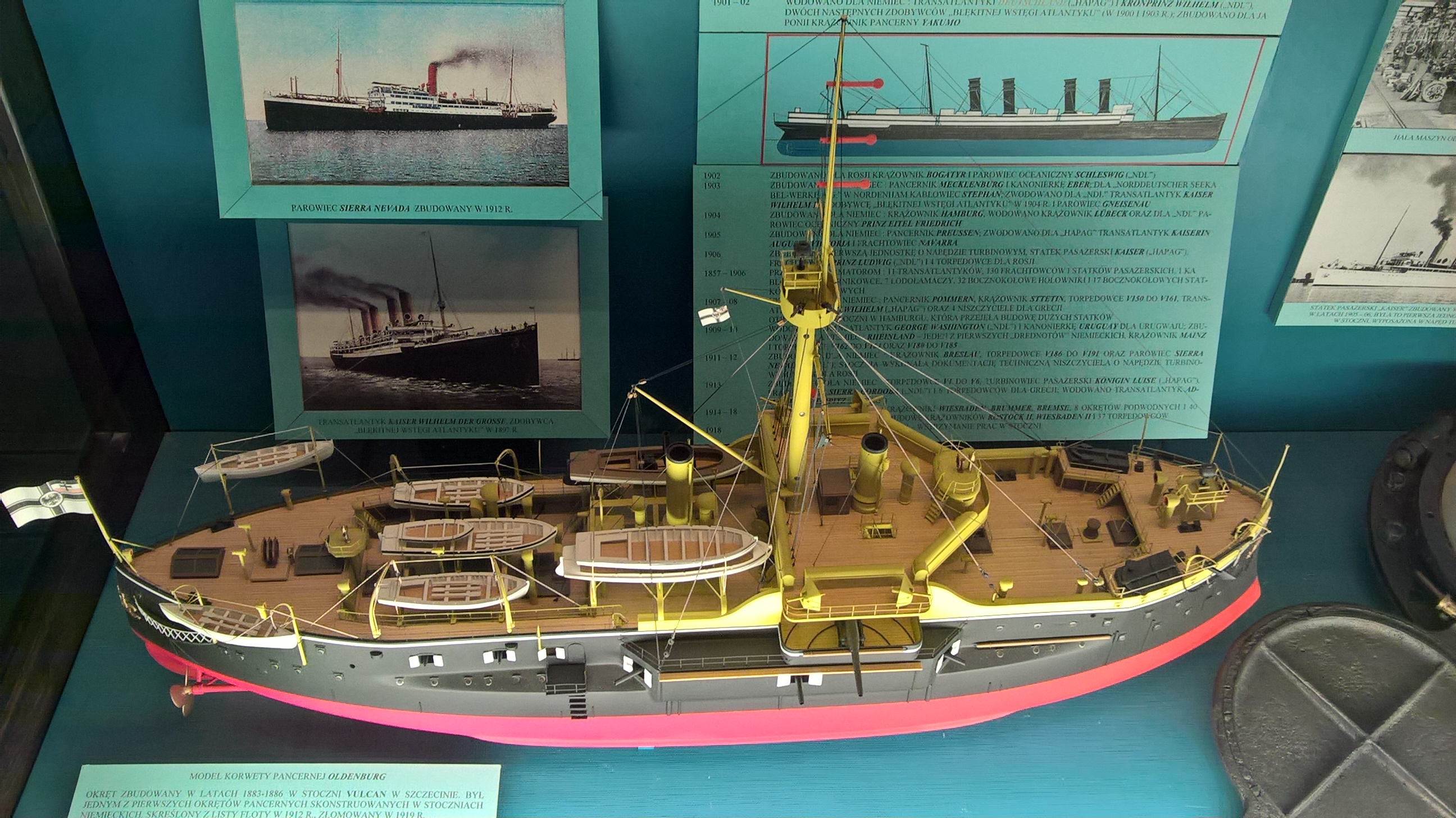
Model of SMS Oldenburg showing the gun

The German ironclad warship SMS Oldenburg had eight 24 cm MRK L/30. The ship was known before launch as 'Panzerkorvette E'. In 1882, money was requested from parliament to order the order the ship's heavy guns and carriages in the beginning of the fiscal year 1883/4. These heavy guns and carriages would cost 900,000 Mark out of a total armament cost of 1,427,000 Mark for this ship.

As the Dutch government would order their first guns in 1883, it seems both governments ordered their gun at about the same time. Assuming that 1 guilder = 1.7 reichsmark, the price in marks of 1 Dutch gun would have been 86,360 Mark for the gun and 32,300 for its carriage, making 118,660. However, assuming that the Dutch minimal embrasure carriage was more expensive, both governments paid about the same price. This allows us to dismiss the possibility of Oldenburg using refurbished older 24 cm guns.

=== Netherlands ===
As mentioned above, Fort IJmuiden had five 24 cm MRK L/30.

The Dutch would also use the 24 cm MRK L/30 at nl:Fort aan den Hoek van Holland. This also started with mentions of 24 cm guns in armored cupolas. When it was expected that the first armored cupola for the fortress would be finished in 1885, budget was request to order the guns in 1884. The cost was again estimated at 50,000 guilders a piece.

== Bibliography ==
- "Etat für den Reichstag auf das Etatsjahr 1883 84". Verhandlungen des Bundesrathes des Deutschen Reichs: 1883/84. Reichsdr. 1882. p. Bijlagen 8. 1–2.
- Fischer, Eduard (1876). "Die Ausstellung F. Krupp's zu Philadelphia in artilleristischer Beziehung". Mitteilungen über Gegenstände des Artillerie- und Geniewesens. K.K. Technischen & Administrativen Militär-Comité. p. 405.
- Hojel, W.C. (1885). "Berekening van uitvaartshoeken en eindsnelheden met inachtneming van den invloed van den tijd". De Militaire Spectator. Broese & Comp. Breda: 380–390.
- Von Müller, Hermann (1879), Die Entwickelung der preußischen Küsten- und Schiffs-Artillerie von 1860-1878, Robert Oppenheim, Berlin
- "Van Alles Wat, Proeven genomen door de firma Fried. Krupp te Essen". Militaire Spectator; Tijdschrift voor Het Nederlandsche Leger. Broese & Comp., Breda. 1879.
- "De Proeven te Meppen in Augustus 1879". De Militaire Spectator. Broese & Comp. Breda: 637–649. 1879.
- Reuther (1881). "Begrooting van uitgaven ten behoeve van de voltooijing van het vestingstelsel, dienst 1881". Militaire Spectator; Tijdschrift voor Het Nederlandsche Leger. Broese & Comp., Breda: 393–400.
- Reuther (1882). "Staatsbegrooting voor het dienstjaar 1883". Bijlagen van het verslag der handelingen 1882-1883. Tweede Kamer der Staten Generaal, Den Haag. p. Bijlagen A VIII MvT.
- Sc (1880). "Die Neuere Schiffs- und Küstengeschütze der Krupp'schen Gussstahlfabrik". Mittheilungen aus dem Gebiete des Seewesens. K.K. Hydrographischen Amte, Marine-Bibliothek, Pola: 693–706.
- "Schiessversuche der F. Krupp'schen Gusstahlfabrik ... bei Meppen". Mitteilungen über Gegenstände des Artillerie- und Geniewesens. K.K. Technischen & Administrativen Militär-Comité. 1879. p. 481–544, 582.
- Schwarz, Jos. (1882). "Schiessversuche der Fr. Krupp'schen Gusstahlfabrik". Mittheilungen aus dem Gebiete des Seewesens. K.K. Hydrographischen Amte, Marine-Bibliothek, Pola: 389–397, 539–546.
- Smith, Charles S.; Crispin, S. (1880). "A set of tables showging ... the most powerful rifled guns ... 1880..." House Documents. Government Printing Office, Washington. pp. 506–516.
- "Begrooting van uitgaven ten behoeve van de voltooijing van het vestingstelsel, dienst 1881". Bijlagen van het verslag der handelingen. Tweede Kamer der Staten Generaal, Den Haag. 1880. p. Bijlagen 8. 1–2.
- Weitzel (1883). "Staatsbegrooting voor het dienstjaar 1884, hoofdstuk VIII". Militaire Spectator; Tijdschrift voor Het Nederlandsche Leger. Broese & Comp., Breda: 157–186.
