= 24 cm MRK L/25.5 =

German naval gun

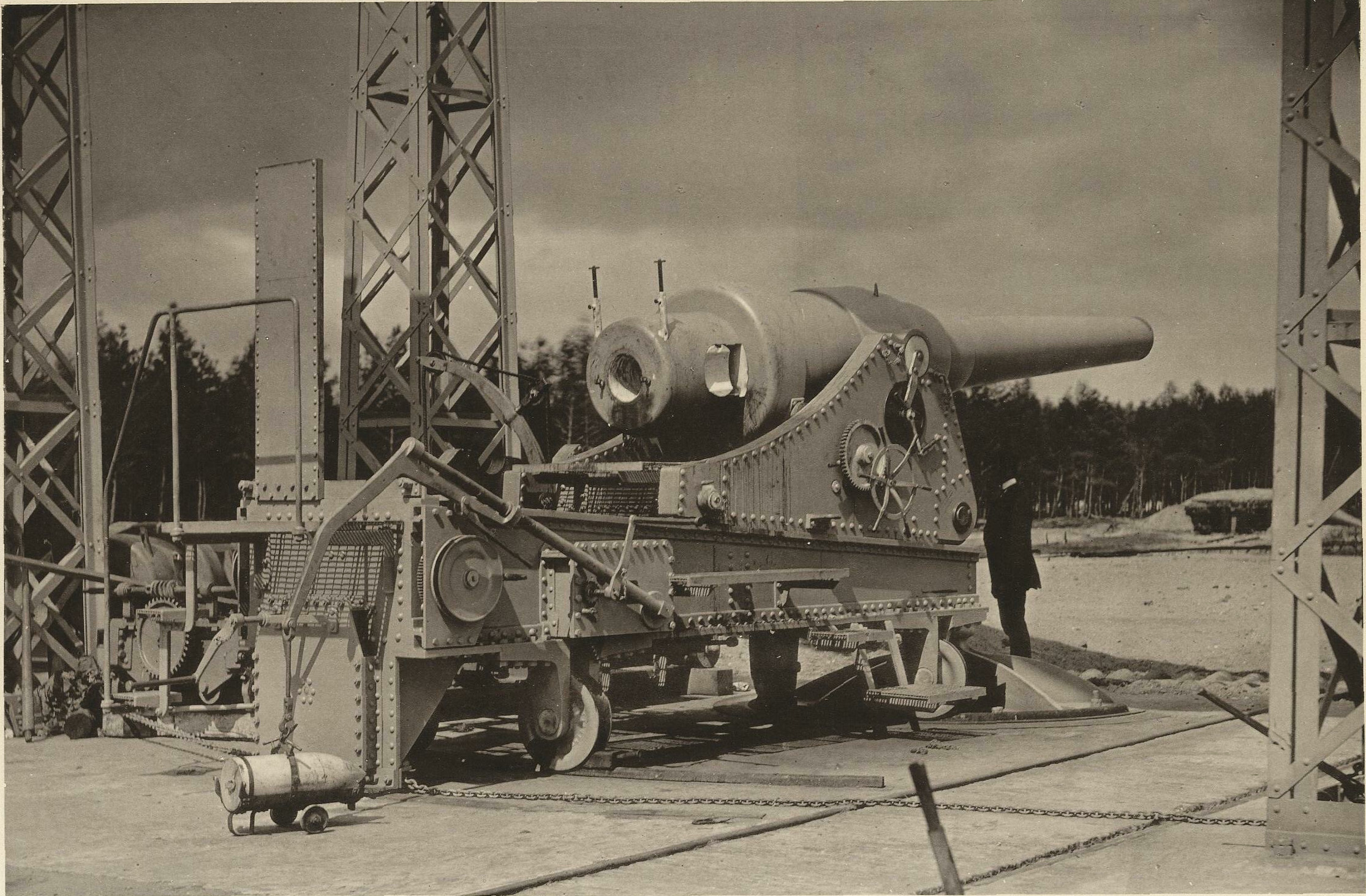
- The 24 cm MRK L/25.5 in Meppen in August 1879
- Type: Naval gun Coastal artillery
- Place of origin: German Empire

Service history
- In service: -
- Used by: None (prototype)

Production history
- Designer: Krupp
- Manufacturer: Krupp
- Produced: 1878

Specifications
- Mass: 18,000 kg
- Length: 6,120 mm (L/25.5)
- Shell: Separate loading bagged charges and projectiles
- Caliber: 24 cm (9.4 in)
- Breech: Cylindro-prismatic breech block
- Elevation: 27°
- Muzzle velocity: 576.6 m/s (160 kg steel grenade) 606.9 m/s (136 kg steel grenade)

The 24 cm MRK L/25.5 was a Krupp prototype naval gun developed in the late 1870s. It was one of two guns that Krupp made to test the application of scientific discoveries with regard to gunpowder. These discoveries made it possible to use higher charges by enlarging the chamber of the gun. During an August 1879 test in Meppen, the gun pierced 51 cm of armor. This test prompted the last competitors to switch to steel guns and breech loading.

== Context ==
=== The 24 cm RK L/22 ===
In the late 1860s, Krupp developed its first series of Ring Kanonen. These were built-up guns that were reinforced (put under stress) by hoops or Ringe. The first 24 cm (235.4 mm) model for use on board ships was the 24 cm RK L/20. For coastal defense, the army got a few 24 cm RK L/22, but finally decided to use another caliber.

=== The 24 cm MRK L/25 ===
The 24 cm MRK L/25 was a major step forward from the L/22. The fact that the gun had an increased caliber of 240 mm instead of only 235.4 mm was a mere detail. It had the same absolute length, but was still L/22 long. The prototype was first tested in December 1875. An important innovation was that it used a charge that was about 60% higher than that of the 24 cm RK L/22.

As a result of the test, the 24 cm MRK was lengthened to L/25. Other innovations that the gun brought for the 24 cm caliber were heavier projectiles and projectiles that used copper driving bands. Even the prototype of this gun was thought to be 40% more powerful than the original 24 cm RK L/22.

== Development ==
=== Gunpowder technology in Germany ===
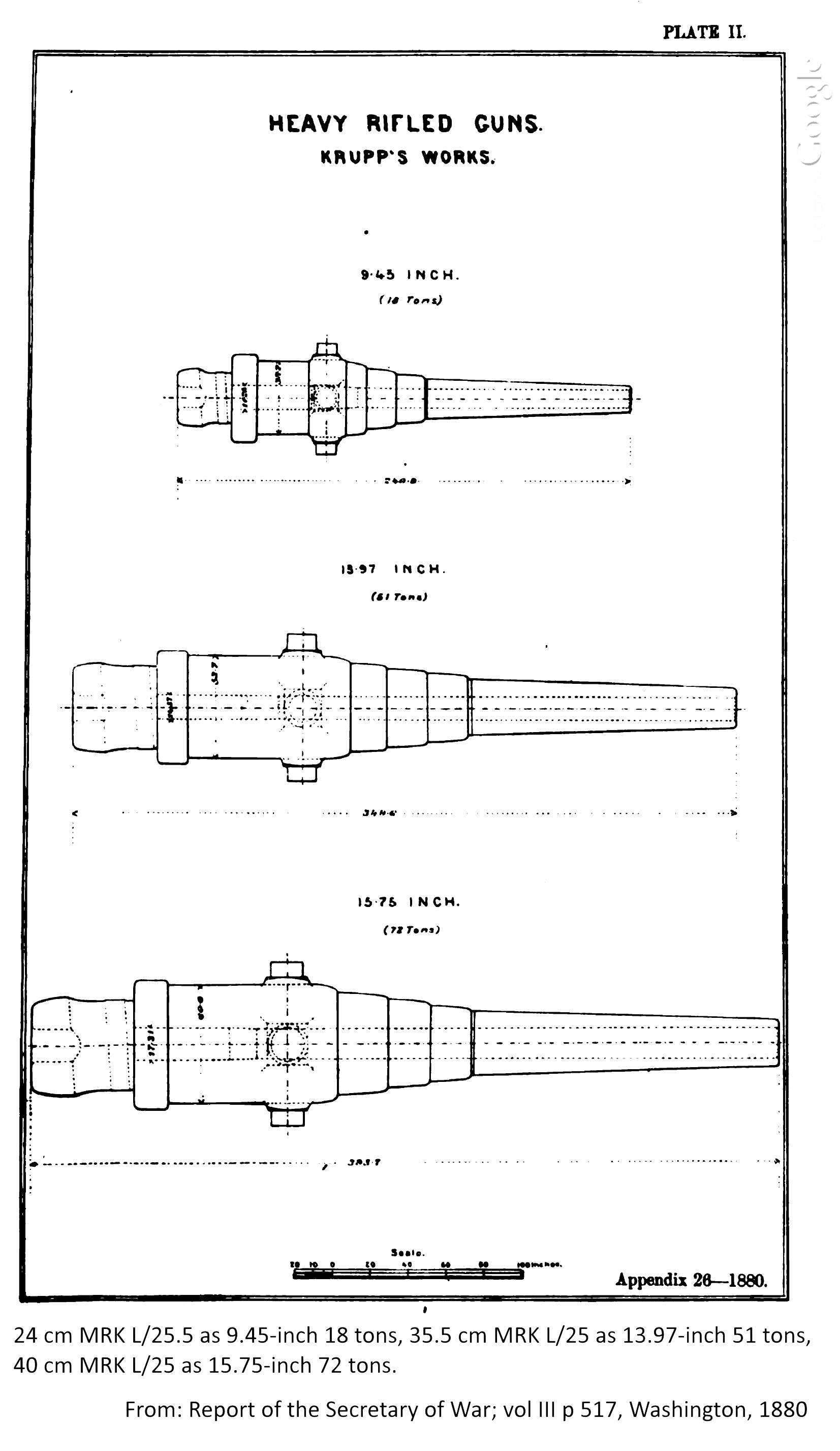
The L/25.5 and two very heavy Krupp guns

In the crucial 1868 comparative tests, the 24 cm RK L/20 was only able to beat the British muzzleloading 9-inch Armstrong Gun after it started to use prismatic gunpowder. The first approved type of Prismatic Powder had a density of 1.66 and was known as P.P. C/68, approved in November 1868. The main problem of the P.P. C/68 was that it was very difficult to produce it with a consistent density. This was caused by the presence of 7 relatively narrow channels.

The next approved type of prismatic gunpowder was P.P. C/75 with a density of 1.75. After extensive tests, this new powder with a density of 1.75 and only a single channel, was approved as P.P. C/75 in October 1875. In 1876, tests with the 26 cm gun led to very good results, but with the 28 cm gun the powder led to dangerous gas pressures of over 4,000 atm, while only 3,500 atm was allowed for this gun.

An investigation found that the P.P. C/75 was still of very irregular density: 1.70-1.80. After production was improved, an 1877 test with the 28 cm gun found very consistent low peak pressures of only 2,000 atm at a charge of 58 kg.

At the time, guns used separate loading bagged charges and projectiles. The bag containing the charge was filled with layers of prisms. Multiple combinations of the number of layers and the number of prisms in a layer could make the desired weight. The higher the number of prisms in a layer, the shorter the bag. Now, people began to suspect that a shorter bag contributed to sometimes unexplainably high peak pressures.

After some tests, the Artillerie Prüfungskommission concluded that the diameter of the bag had to be in a certain relation to the diameter of the chamber. However, while quite some tests where done, it was not directly possible to deduct a rule for this, and so the construction of the bag was determined by experiments.

While the Dutch used pebble gunpowder for their 24 cm MRK L/25, they also noted that the way the bags were packed was relevant. In August 1877, they noted that with a 38 kg charge, a bag with a diameter of 0.20 m gave a velocity of 470 m/s and an average peak pressure 2,472 atm. A shorter bag of equal weight, but with a diameter of 0.22 m gave a velocity of only 467.2 m/s and a higher average peak pressure of 2,750 atm. The result was one more example that higher pressures do not always lead to higher velocities.

=== An overview about the effects of windage ===
An 1880 overview of the most powerful rifled guns of the time of course mentioned guns like the 100-ton gun, the RML 16-inch 80-ton gun, and the 40 cm MRK L/25 and other monster guns. However, it also included 'certain guns of minor caliber - 5.87", 6", 8", and 9.45", respectively - but of relatively great power, owing to the large charges employed'.

The overview continued by mentioning that these guns had a large chamber to accommodate the large charge and had a long length of bore to consume it. Furthermore, that the number of cubic inches allowed per pound of powder, indicated that there was a considerable windage or air space about the bag in the chamber. This was what made it practicable to use higher charges without overstraining the gun.

The overview then continued to explain that when gunpowder exploded in a smaller chamber, it would reach a higher peak pressure than when it exploded in a larger chamber. (This was kind of obvious) The other factors that determined the peak pressure were less obvious. The inflammation speed, i.e. the speed with which the inflammation went from grain to grain, depended on the degree of tension in the first instance of explosion. I.e. the speed with which the ignition of gunpowder took place decreased in a larger chamber. Furthermore, the velocity of combustion, i.e. the speed with which each distinct grain burned, also depended on the pressure. A higher pressure leading the grain to burn faster.

The overview concluded that a certain windage about the cartridge (bagged charge), provided the conditions for a slow, deliberate gasification of the charge. The tension of the gas would be lower and inflammation and combustion would proceed more slowly. In turn the inertia of the projectile would be overcome more gradually and the maximum pressure would be less. It also noted that the same result could be attained with larger grained and denser powders.

This knowledge could be applied by just adding to the charge (adding velocity) while keeping down the pressure by allowing enough air-space. However, if the length of bore was not long enough, the projectile would have left the barrel before all of the charge had burned. Therefore, longer guns had to be made.

=== United Kingdom vs. Germany ===
The overview about the effects of windage concluded that after about 1876/7, Armstrong began to apply this knowledge in its 6 and 8-inch guns and Krupp began to apply it to its 6 and 9.45-inch guns. These guns used a charge of half the weight of their normal projectiles and attained astonishing velocities of about 2,100 Ft/s.

Before these guns appeared, the Elswick Ordnance Company tested its EOC 12-inch L/23.5 in February 1877. In March 1877 the Royal Arsenal then tested a chambered RML 12.5-inch 38-ton gun. These guns did not use such high charges, but the British manufacturers actually seem to have been ahead in the application of windage to reduce pressure.

== The 24 cm MRK L/25.5 ==
=== Development ===
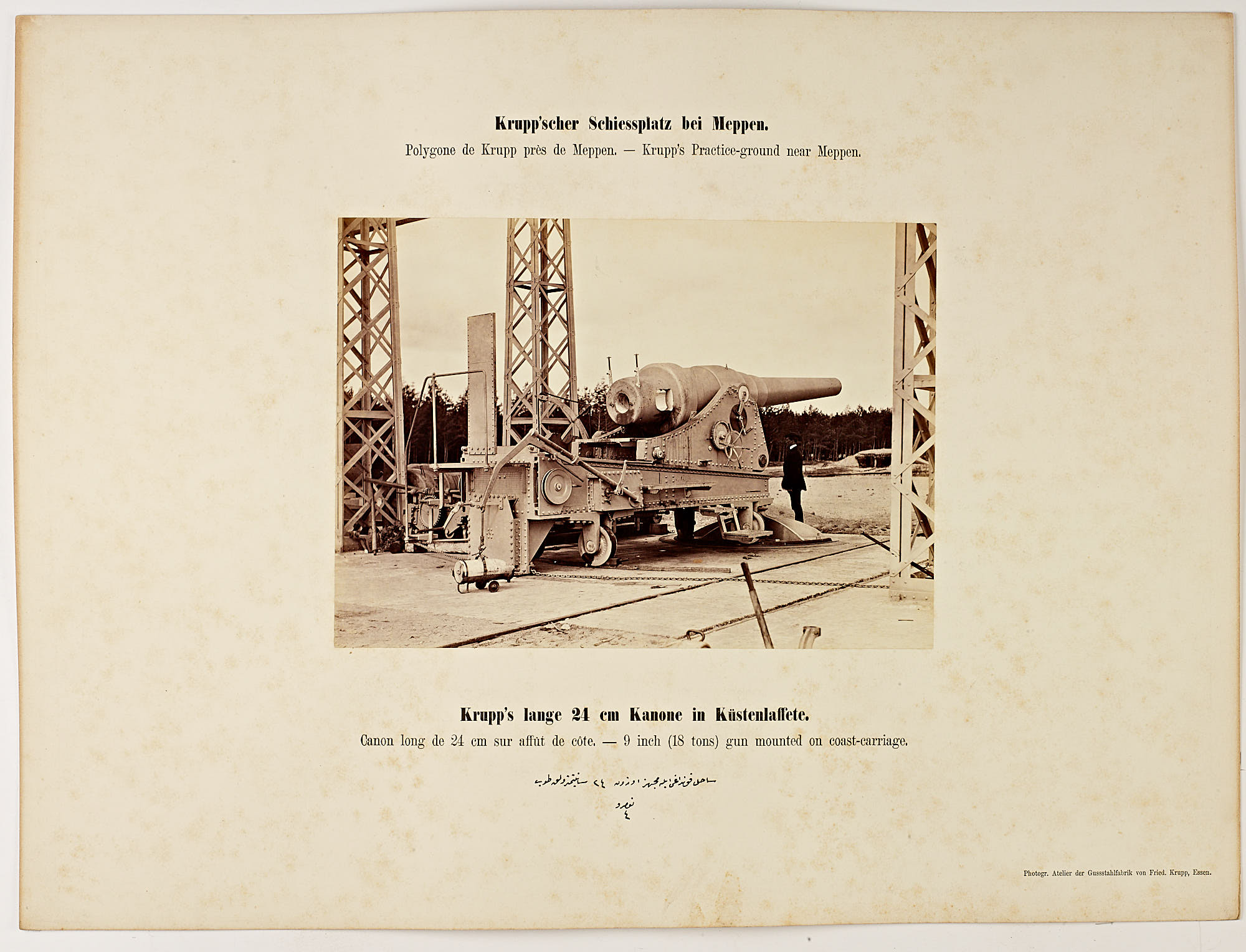
Under test in Meppen

Krupp's first attempts to produce guns with an increased chamber centered on two pieces: the 15 cm MRK L/28 and our 24 cm MRK L/25.5. These were both planned to get heavier (i.e. longer) projectiles to profit from the increased charge, but the 15 cm got them first.

=== Test in Essen (1878) ===
On 14 December 1878, the new Krupp 24 cm MRK L/25.5 gun was tested at the company range in Essen. A Dutch journal noted that the 24 cm MRK L/25.5 gun was like the 'Dutch' 24 cm MRK L/25, except for these changes: minor increase of weight to 18,000 kg; minor increase of length to L/25.5; corresponding increased length of bore of L/22.5, and increased diameter of the chamber from 247 mm to 286 mm, making it significantly wider than the caliber of the gun.

The Dutch observer also noted the length of the powder chamber as varying between 1,264 and 1,268 mm. (This depended on the exact length of the projectile.) For the 160 kg projectile he noted the length as 1,268 mm, but did not comment on it.

An Austro-Hungarian observer started by writing that the excellent results that Armstrong had achieved with its new guns with enlarged chamber and corresponding lengthened barrel, had obviously induced Krupp to also experiment in this direction. He stated that the new 24 cm gun had been designed according to these principles. He also noted the diameter of the chamber as 286 mm and noted the average volume of the chamber for the 78 kg charge as about 81.46 dm^{3}. Probably ignorant of the L/25 gun, he then continued with a comparison to the 24 cm RK L/22. This of course showed a spectacular improvement, but made it difficult to pinpoint the effects of the bigger chamber.

The volume of the chamber at 81.46 dm^{3} can be related to the length of the chamber by first calculating the surface of the diameter. A diameter of 286 mm gives a surface of 642 cm^{2}. Dividing 81,460 cm^{3} by 642 cm^{2} gives a length of the powder chamber of 1,268 mm which is in line with the lengths that the Dutch observer noted.

To really understand the difference between the L/25.5 and the L/25, we can make a similar calculation for the preceding L/25. Its powder chamber was 97.5 cm long. Its diameter of 24.66 cm gives a surface of 477.61 cm^{2} multiplied by 97.5 the volume of the L/25 chamber becomes 46,567 cm^{3}, or 46.57 dm^{3}. Dividing 81,46 by 46.57, we get that the chamber of the L/25.5 was 75% bigger than that of the L/25.

As an aside, the chamber of the old L/22 gun measured 34.18 dm^{3}. This made that the previous step from the L/22 to the L/25 (46.57 / 34.18) had increased the volume of the chamber by only 36%.

The most notable feature of the December 1878 L/25.5 test, was the charge. With 78 kg of gunpowder instead of only 39 kg for the L/25, this had doubled. The result was a spectacular performance improvement, as a 160.5 kg grenade was propelled to a velocity of 583 m/s instead of only 473 m/s for the L/25. That same month, the comparable 15 cm MRK L/28 was tested in Meppen.

=== Test in Meppen (1879) ===
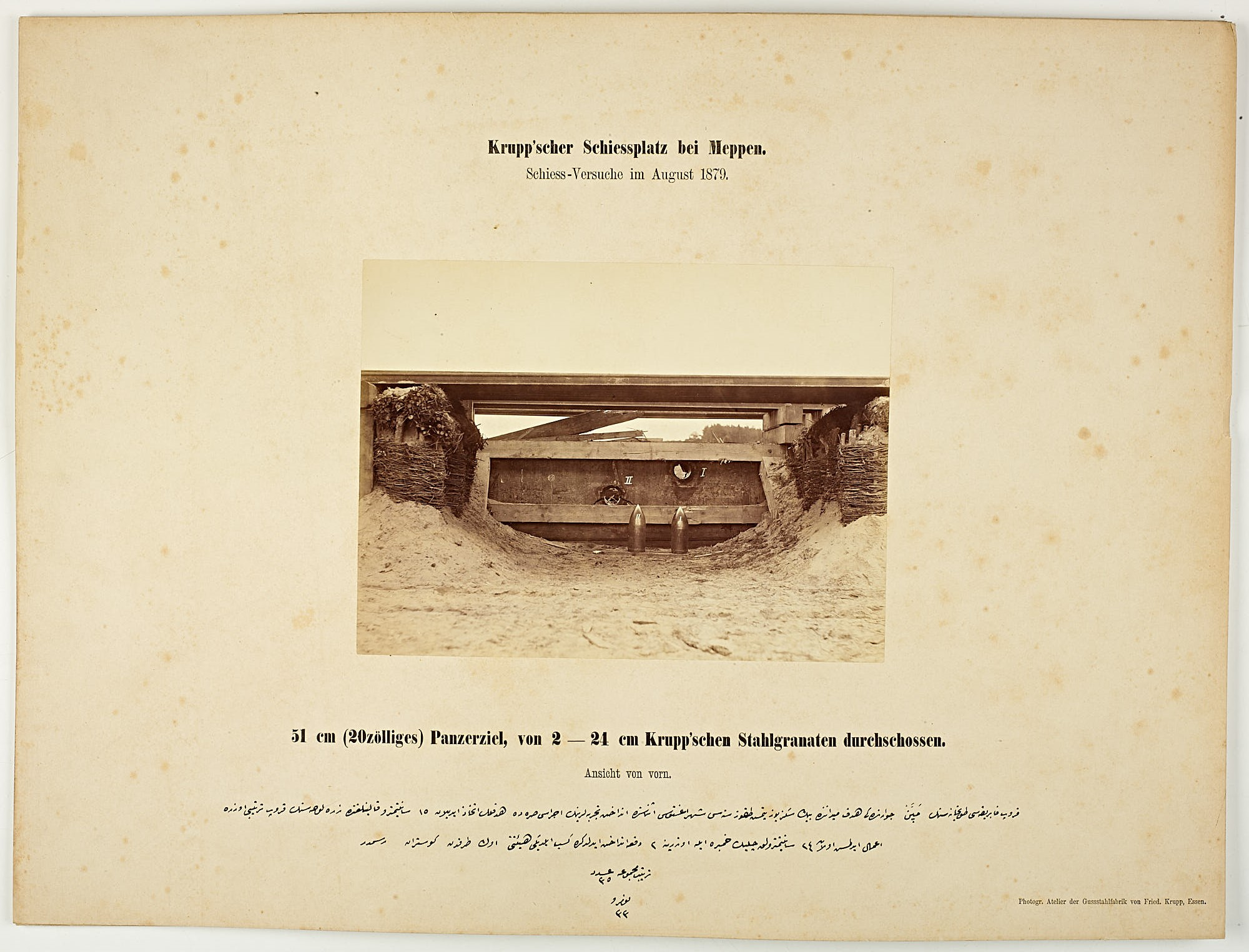
The armored target, front

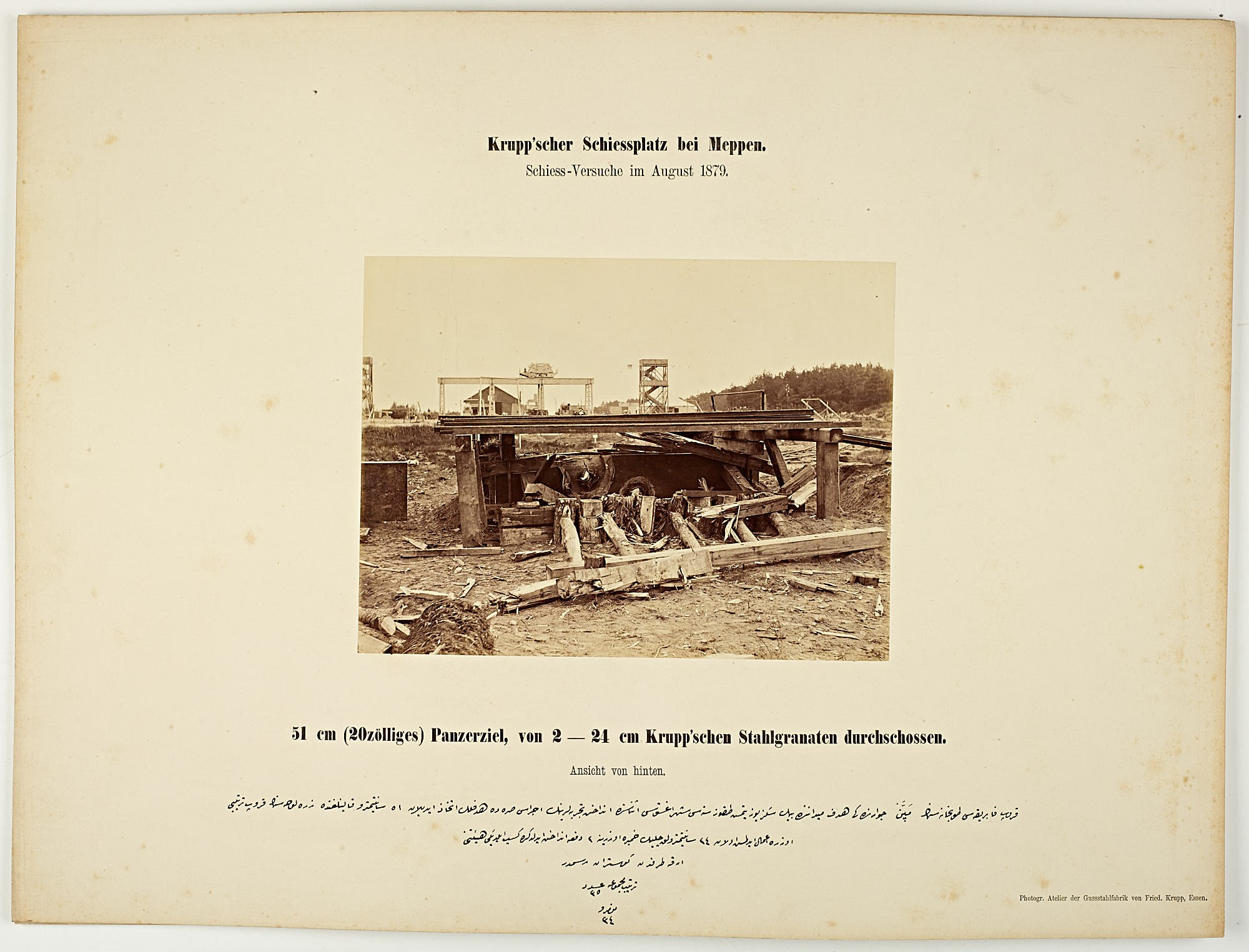
The armored target, back

On 7 August 1879, the 24 cm MRK L/25.5 was tested in Meppen. The name of the gun was then: 'Lange 24 cm Kanone Nr. 77. During the tests in Meppen, the length of the 'Anfänglicher Verbrennungsraum' for the steel projectile was on average 1,274.4 mm. If this is multiplied with the above 642 cm^{2}, the result is the 81,817 cm^{3} noted during this test.

In Meppen, the gun used a charge of 75 kg of P.P. C/75 gunpowder, which gave a velocity of 573 m/s for the steel grenade and 603 m/s for the regular grenade. Both measured at 75 m from the muzzle. Corrected for this distance, these figures were 576.6 and 606.9 m/s. At 1,979 m from the muzzle, the heavier projectile still had a velocity of 466.9 m/s, while the lighter one had fallen back to 465.8 m/s.

This made the 24 cm MRK L/25.5 an exceptionally powerful gun. There were basically two accepted ways to measure a gun's power against armor: energy per centimeter circumference of the projectile or energy per square centimeter of the diameter of the projectile. The tests showed that the L/25.5 prototype was more effective against armor than all other guns up to and including the 32 cm / 12.5 inch caliber. The only exception was the experimental Armstrong 12-inch 40 tons gun, which was more effective if judged by centimeter of circumference of the projectile.

The figures of the 24 cm MRK L/25.5 were expected to become even better when the projected longer projectiles of 215 kg were used. Data about these would be published later. During the August 1879 tests, the similar 15 cm MRK L/28 fired very long L/4 projectiles. It was said that similar projectiles were still under test for the 24 cm MRK L/25.5 and could therefore not be used. However, it was also said that during a test in Essen in January 1879 the gun had shown that it was able to effectively use these longer 215 kg projectiles.

The accuracy of the gun was not so good. This was blamed on the gunpowder, that burned a bit too slow and irregular and on that other kinds were not sufficiently available. During the test, the average speed of the wind was 4.10 m/s from the south west or 3 beaufort. What can be considered in this respect, is that the 15 cm MRK L/28 had the fast L/25 twist rate that was required to stabilize the longer projectiles, especially in strong winds. The 24 cm L/25.5 had a more traditional slow twist rate of L/45. Therefore, it might have been a deliberate decision not to use the long projectiles.

=== Tested against armor ===
The data and calculations from the 7 August 1879 test showed that the 24 cm MRK L/25.5 was exceptionally powerful, but exceptional results generally require more proof. Krupp had therefore ordered armor plates that the gun's steel projectile should be able to overcome with 11% of its power remaining after passing through. The armor was made by Dillinger Hütte, which might have been a precaution against accusations of tampering with the results.

The armored target consisted of two wrought iron plates of 30.5 and 20.5 cm thickness separated by a 5 cm layer of wood. It was placed about 150 m from the gun. The very first shot went straight through and landed 2,200 m behind the target. A second shot also went through and made large rips in the target. It landed 1,200 m behind the target. The steel grenades that were used were found to be almost unaltered after penetrating the target.

=== The 1880 Düsseldorf exhibition ===
In 1880, Krupp exhibited its latest monster gun, the 40 cm MRK L/25 at the big Gewerbe Ausstellung in Düsseldorf. Krupp also exhibited some very big projectiles. Of these, the 24 cm steel grenade which had gone through the armor in Meppen got most attention.

== Characteristics ==
=== Technical ===
The barrel of the 24 cm MRK L/25.5 was 6,120 mm (L/25.5) long with a length of bore of 5,410 mm. The weight including the breech was 18,000 kg. The gun had 54 grooves of 1.5 mm depth and 9.96 mm width. The lands were 4.0 mm wide and the twist rate was 45 calibers. The diameter of the gunpowder chamber was 286 mm. The twist rate was relatively slow at L/45.

The carriage of the L/25.5 had a firing height of 2,412 mm. It could elevate to 27 degrees and decline to 6 degrees and weighed 12,300 kg. It was somewhat different from that of the 'Dutch' L/25 or the 35.5 cm L/25. The first change had to do with how the recoil was handled. Another change was that the projectile could be lifted by a crane with a spring, just like the 40 cm MRK L/25 had. Finally, when the gun was elevated or declined, the change was transferred from the trunnion to an indicator. See the photo with the handle extending from the trunnion. It made the elevation indicator independent from the machine that elevated the gun.

The 24 cm MRK L/25.5 could fire the traditional projectiles that the L/25 fired. These were L/2.8 long and had two copper driving bands. The steel grenade weighed 160 kg, including an explosive charge of 3.75 kg. The chilled cast iron grenade also weighed 160 kg, of which 2.1 kg was the explosive charge. Finally, the regular grenade weighed 136 kg of which 7.2 kg was an explosive charge. The projectiles planned for the L/25.5 were heavier and longer L/3.5 and L/4 projectiles. These would be slower, but have more impact. However, the gun might not have been able to effectively use these, see above.

== Significance ==
=== An exceptionally powerful gun ===
Before the 24 cm MRK L/25.5 was tested in Meppen in August 1879, the 15 cm MRK L/28 prototype had already shown to be an excellent gun. Perhaps it was even better than the 24 cm gun, because it already had the fast twist rate required for using longer projectiles, see above.

However, the 24 cm MRK L/25.5 had proven to be more effective against armor than all other guns up to and including the 32 cm / 12.5 inch caliber. This was illustrated by tables comparing it to these guns that often weighed more than double the 17,000 kg of the 24 cm MRK L/25.5.

=== International reaction ===
In countries that already used Krupp guns, like Germany, Austria-Hungary, and the Netherlands, the significance of the results was clear: Only a few heavy guns were clearly more powerful than the 24 cm MRK L/25.5. However, their days were numbered, as a Dutch observer noted that Krupp would soon apply the improvements of the 24 cm gun to the higher calibers.

In the United Kingdom, there were some who reacted to the August 1879 tests by concluding that the Royal Arsenal at Woolwich had been left hopelessly in the rear by Krupp. On the other hand, Armstrong was thought to have attained equally good results with a 6-inch and an 11-inch gun. That there was indeed some resentment against the Royal Arsenal shines through in a July 1880 paper. The paper began by casting doubt on the quality of the armor target. It then continued by implying that before the application of larger chambers, there was no need to switch to breechloading, because the length of bore of the British battering guns was L/14 to L/18 and foreign guns had very similar dimensions.

The paper then made a comparison between the 24 cm L/25.5 and some guns of similar weight. These were e.g.: the designed Woolwich 9.2-inch rifled breechloader (RBL) of 18 tons weight, Armstrong's untested 9-inch RBL of 18 tons, Armstrong's 10 inch 20 tons gun, the Woolwich 10-inch 18 ton gun with proposed increased charge, etc. It concluded that if Armstrong's untested RBL attained its designed velocity, it would have the best perforation. The designed Woolwich gun would come in second, but be better at 3,000 yards (no if here). The Krupp gun would come in third place if it had indeed attained the reported velocity of 1,891 feet per second. The other guns were clearly less powerrful.

In the United States, the reaction was much more down to earth. An author concluded that the August 1879 tests had proven the superiority of three choices for manufacturing guns: breechloading, longer barrels, and the use of steel for both the inner tube and the reinforcement. He then immediately continued to treat the 24 cm L/25.5. Continuing about the L/25.5 he then noted British correspondents mentioning that it was about as powerful as Woolwich guns of twice its weight.

The American author continued by stating that after the 'defeat at Meppen' prompt and energetic efforts to 'repair the disaster' were made in the United Kingdom. Armstrong and Woolwich now switched to breeachloading and longer barrels. Woolwich then designed a new 9.2 inch gun (the gun mentioned above) to meet the 24 cm L/25.5.

Meanwhile, the Elswick Ordnance Company known as Armstrong, had designed an 8-inch breechloader that it had tested in December 1878. According to the same author, the 24 cm L/25.5 then forced Armstrong to start construction of a new 9-inch gun to compete with it. This was Armstrong's 9-inch RBL of 18 tons mentioned above.

=== Further development, the C/80 ===
The tests with 24 cm L/25.5, the 15 cm MRK L/28, the 35.5 cm MRK L/25, and the 40 cm MRK L/25 led Krupp to design a whole new series of 30 and 35 caliber long guns, the so-called C/80 system. However, this was initially only a set of calculations.

After August 1879, the Royal Arsenal at Woolwich and Armstrong's Elswick Ordnance Company rushed to produce 9 and 9.2-inch guns. In view of the above, one would expect Krupp to rush an L/30 version of the L/25.5, but this did not happen. From July 1880 to September 1882, C/80 guns of 15, 21, 26, 28, 30.5, and 35.5 cm were tested in Meppen. The production of the 24 cm MRK L/30 started only after the first order came in in 1883.

== Bibliography ==
- A. (1879). "Krupp'sche 24 cm Kanone neuester Construction". Mittheilungen aus dem Gebeite des Seewesens. K.K. Hydrographischen Amte, Pola. pp. 106–108.
- "Verslag omtrent het onderzoek van buskruit voor kustgeschut". Verslagen, rapporten en memoriën omtrent militaire onderwerpen. Departement van Oorlog, 's-Gravenhage. 1879. pp. 216–272.
- "Several articles". The Engineer. XLIII. The Engineer, London: 134, 203. 1877.
- "The recent gunnery experiments at Meppen". Engineering. Engineering, Bedford Street, London. 1879. pp. 134–135.
- Fischer, Eduard (1876). "Die Ausstellung F. Krupp's zu Philadelphia in artilleristischer Beziehung". Mitteilungen über Gegenstände des Artillerie- und Geniewesens. K.K. Technischen & Administrativen Militär-Comité. p. 405.
- Inglis, T. (1880). "Targets for the Trial of Recent Battering Ordnance". Professional Papers of the Corps of Royal Engineers. IV. The Royal Engineer Institute: 169–194.
- "Die Krupp'sche Ausstellung auf der Gewerbe-Ausstellung zu Düsseldorf". Militär-Zeitung. 15 June 1880.
- "Schieszversuche auf der Krupp'schen Schieszplatze bei Meppen". Monatshefte für Politik und Wehrmacht. F. Schneider & Co. Berlin. 1879. pp. 309–334.
- Von Müller, Hermann (1879), Die Entwickelung der preußischen Küsten- und Schiffs-Artillerie von 1860-1878, Robert Oppenheim, Berlin
- "De Proeven te Meppen in Augustus 1879". De Militaire Spectator. Broese & Comp. Breda: 637–649. 1879.
- "Van Alles Wat, Proeven genomen door de firma Fried. Krupp te Essen". Militaire Spectator; Tijdschrift voor Het Nederlandsche Leger. Broese & Comp., Breda. 1879.
- Sc (1880). "Die Neuere Schiffs- und Küstengeschütze der Krupp'schen Gussstahlfabrik". Mittheilungen aus dem Gebiete des Seewesens. K.K. Hydrographischen Amte, Marine-Bibliothek, Pola: 693–706.
- "Schiessversuche der F. Krupp'schen Gusstahlfabrik ... bei Meppen". Mitteilungen über Gegenstände des Artillerie- und Geniewesens. K.K. Technischen & Administrativen Militär-Comité. 1879. p. 481–544, 582.
- Scherer, F.G.A. (1877). "Het Nederlandsche Stalen kanon van 24 cm" (PDF). Militaire spectator; tijdschrift voor het Nederlandsche lege. Broese, 's Gravenhage. pp. 759–771.
- Schwarz, Jos. (1882). "Schiessversuche der Fr. Krupp'schen Gusstahlfabrik". Mittheilungen aus dem Gebiete des Seewesens. K.K. Hydrographischen Amte, Marine-Bibliothek, Pola: 389–397, 539–546.
- Simpson, E. (1880). "Wants of the Navy - Cannon I - III". Naval Organization and Administration: Pamphlet Collection. The United Service. p. 647–54.
- Smith, Charles S.; Crispin, S. (1880). "A set of tables showing ... the most powerful rifled guns ... 1880..." House Documents. Government Printing Office, Washington. pp. 506–516.
