= Fort IJmuiden =

- IJmuiden in Netherlands
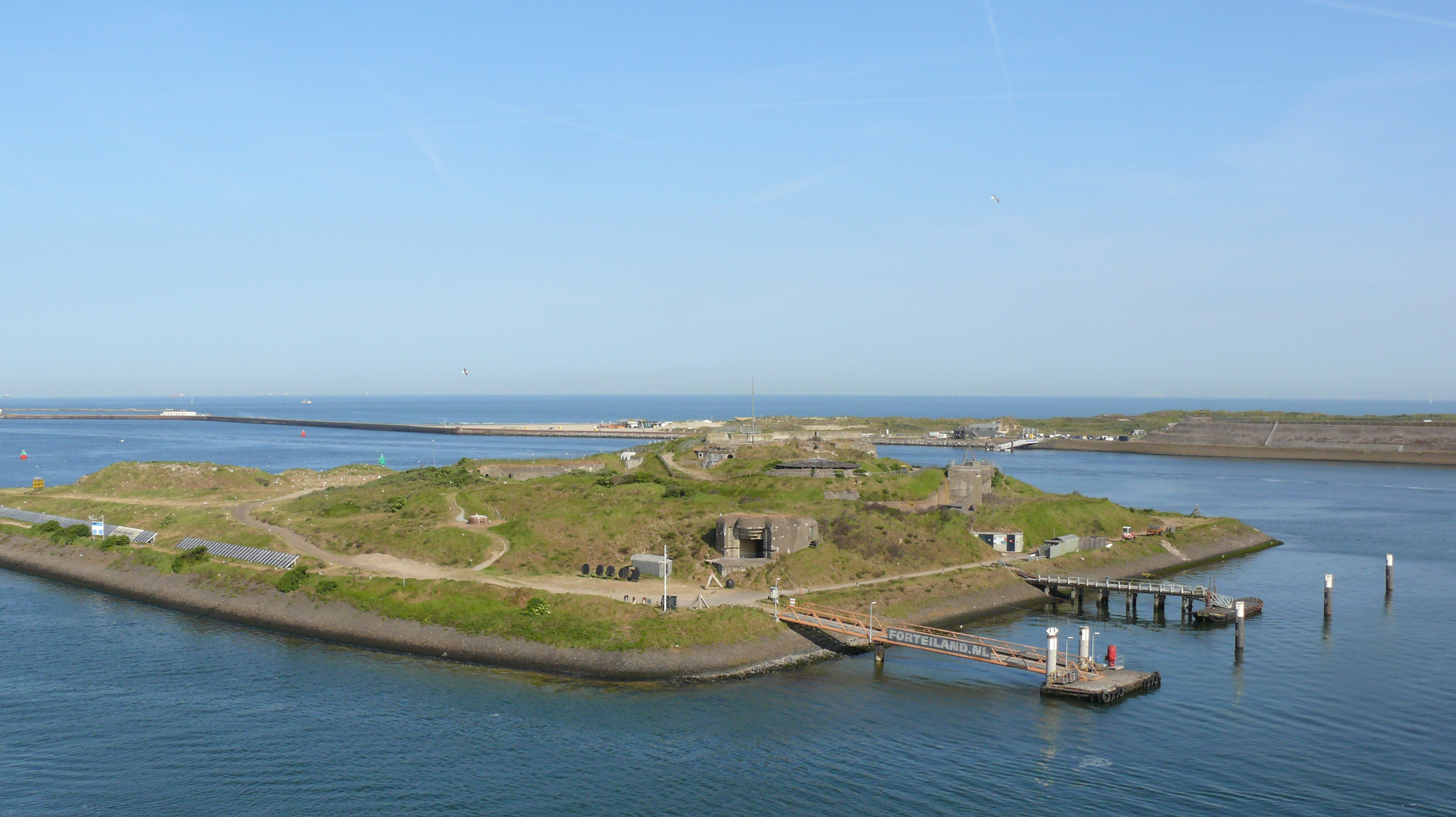
- View of the fort

Site information
- Owner: rijkswaterstaat

Location
- Coordinates: 52°27′55″N 4°34′38″E

Site history
- Built: 1881

Fort IJmuiden is a former fort, now heritage site and event location in IJmuiden North-Holland. It protected the entrance to the North Sea Canal. The fort was originally located north of the canal, but by the construction of a new branch, it became an island. Most of the old fort and some World War II additions have been preserved. A rare armored emplacement that protected five heavy guns, is still in place.

== Context ==
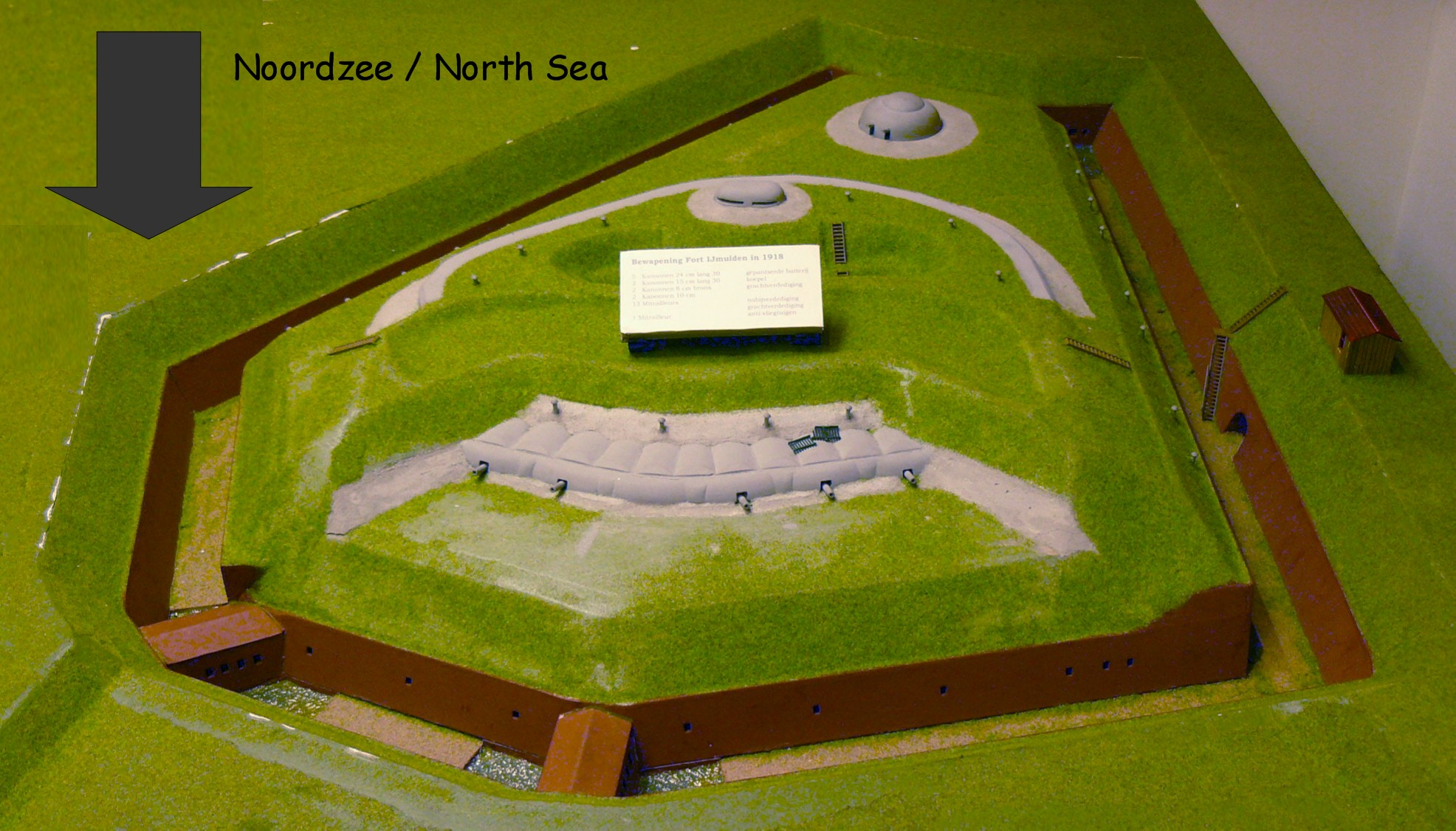
Model of Fort IJmuiden

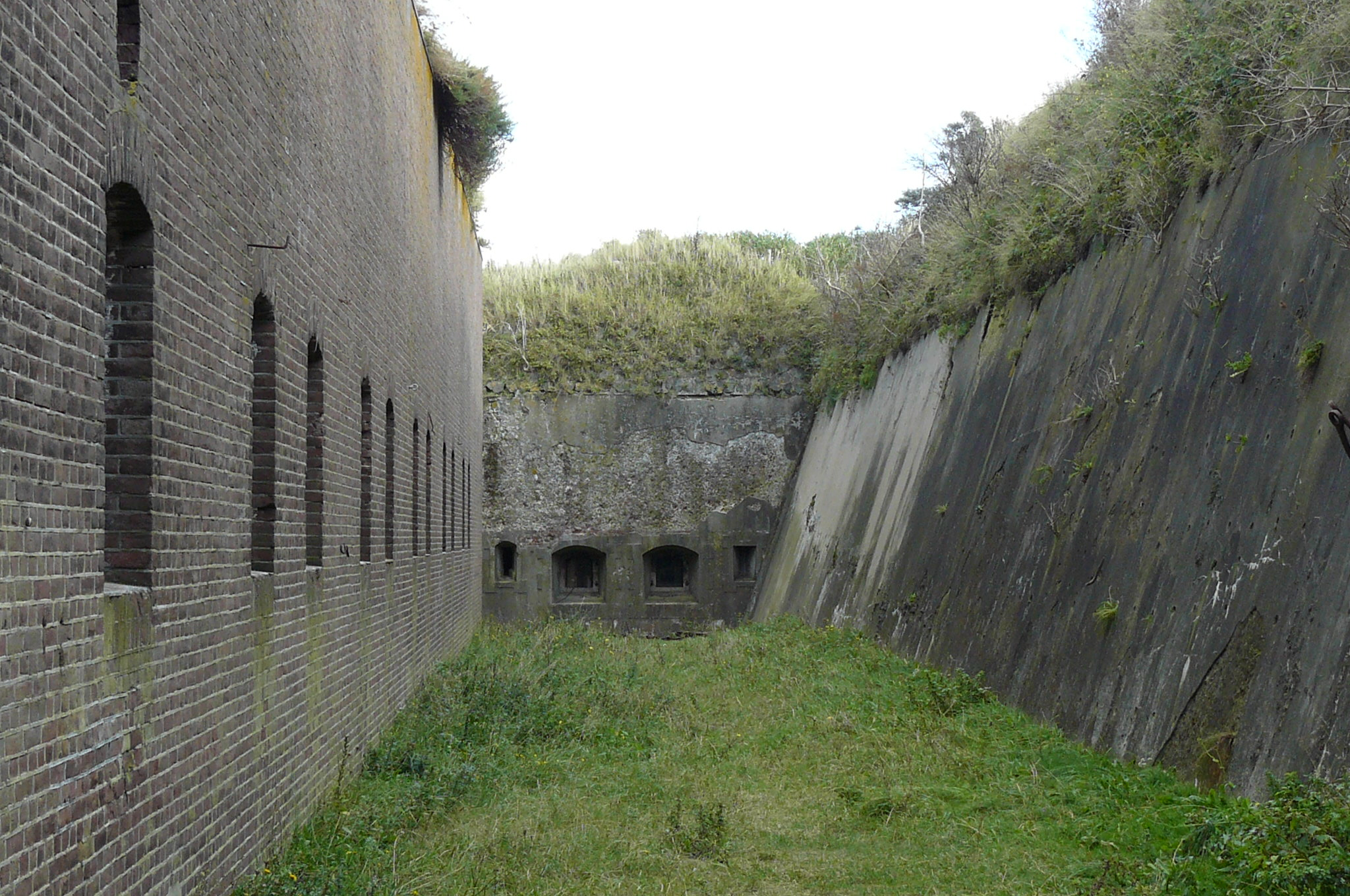
Part of the dry moat

In November 1876, the North Sea Canal was opened. At about the same time, the construction of a fortification and inundation line around Amsterdam, the Stelling van Amsterdam was ordered. This line could only be effective if the North Sea locks at IJmuiden remained under control. Another threat to national security was a possible attack on the North Sea locks from the sea side.

== Planning and construction ==
The timeline of the construction of Fort IJmuiden can be traced back to the government budgets and expenditure. In 1879, a change to the 1879 budget for the completion of the national fortification plan for the first time allocated money to start construction of Fort IJmuiden. This was 250,000 guilders of an estimated total of 1,150,000 guilders. In 1879 1,680 guilders were spent, in 1880 50,350, in 1881 88,200, in 1882 136,150, in 1883 706,530, and in 1884 194,720, while in 1886 expenditure for 1885 was estimated at 328,700 and for 1886 333,900.

== Characteristics ==
=== The concept ===
Fort IJmuiden got the form of an irregular hexagon. On the side facing the entrance of the canal, there was an armored battery with five heavy guns against naval targets. On the land side, at the rear of the fort, there was an armored cupola with two medium guns. The latter primarily served to defend against overland attacks.

The rest of the fort was much like other forts of the time. It was built in brick and had three levels. The lowest level was the biggest and contained the quarters for the 325 men garrison and in the center, ammunition storage. The quarters adjoined the dry moat. In times of war, the windows were covered with steel plates that contained embrasures. On the small section of the dry moat near the cupola, there was a caponnierre, a gallery that contained two 8 cm guns that could enfilade fire shrapnel ammunition along the two longest dry moats. Three more constructions inside the dry moat allowed the same for rifle fire. The second floor contained the ammunition storage for the heavy guns and the guns in the cupola. On top of the barracks, this level was a layer of earth. The highest level contained the main battery and the armored cupola.

=== Main armament ===
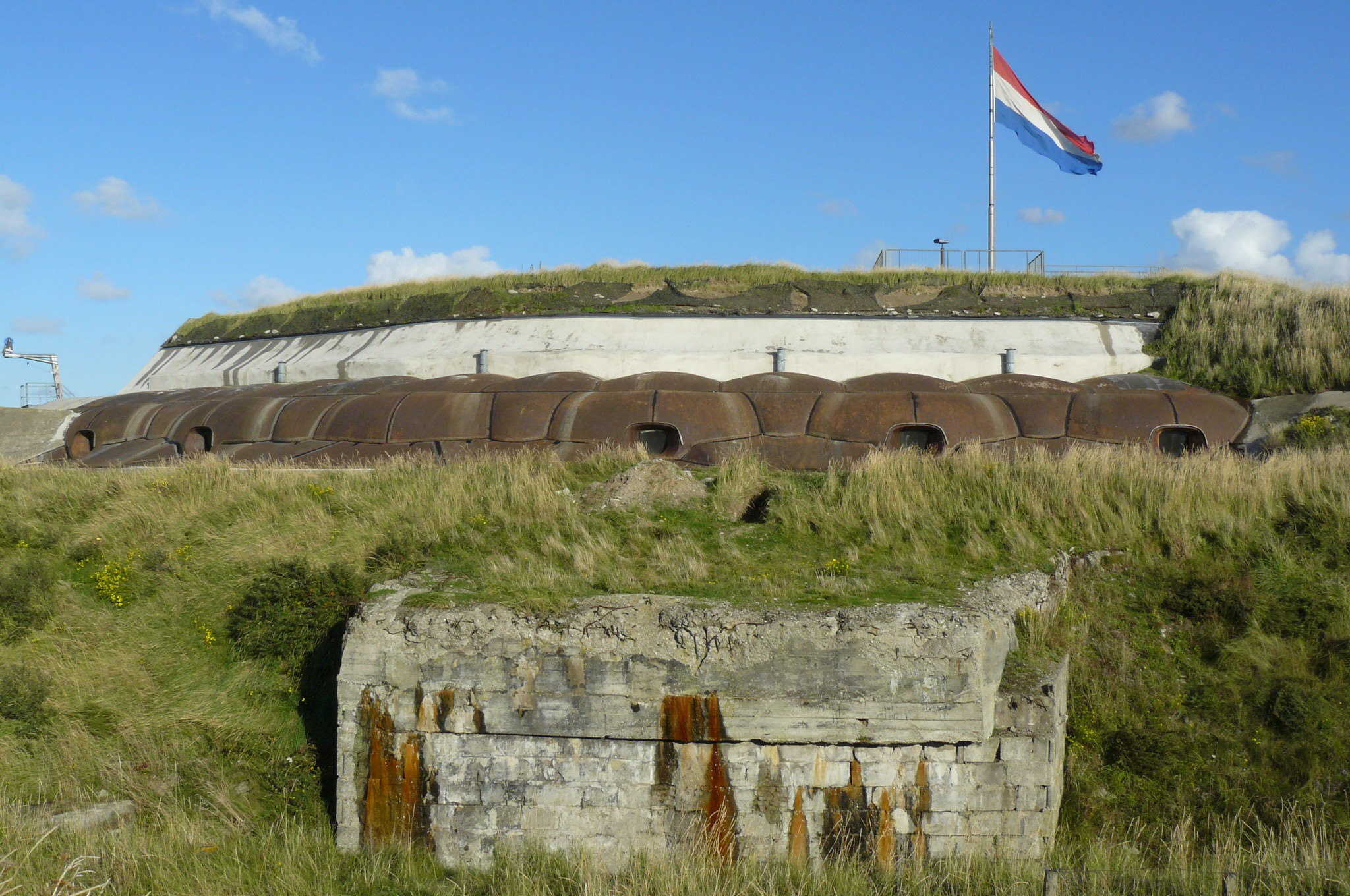
View of the armored gallery pantsergallerij from the sea side

The armament of Fort IJmuiden against naval targets consisted of five 24 cm MRK L/30 guns. At the time, this was a sound choice as armament, as it represented the latest technology. The 24 cm was an accurate gun with a range of about 8 km. For use against armored ships it penetrated 43 cm of wrought iron at 2,000 m. These guns were placed in the long room that is armored on the side facing the sea, the so-called pantsergallerij. The rate of fire of these guns was one shot per 5-6 minutes.

Against land forces, the fort had a rotating armored cupola with two 15 cm MRK L/30. The rate of fire of these guns was one shot per 2.5 minutes.

== History ==
=== Up to World War I ===
In 1886, the Dutch Ministry of War formed a new organization to man the three armored forts that were under construction: Fort Harssens, Fort IJmuiden, and Fort Hoek van Holland. Each of these would get a separate Pantserfort Compagnie. On 1 January 1887, the IJmuiden Company would be founded. The garrison would now and then practice with the big guns, which always posed a serious danger for shipping and was therefore announced in the press.

After completion, Fort IJmuiden quickly became obsolete. Brick and earth forts became obsolete because of the invention of the high-explosive shell in the 1880s. The guns of the fort became obsolete when quick-firing guns of high caliber were introduced in the 1890s. In 1906, a writer noted that a King Edward VII-class battleship or a Braunschweig-class battleship could position itself 400 m before the fort without having to fear for serious damage. Meanwhile, their heavier guns could fire three shots every two minutes.

=== World War I ===
In the runup to World War I, multiple plans were made to reinforce the Dutch coastal defence. For IJmuiden, there were plans to build a second fort, south of the canal. This plan also required inundations against overland attacks.

The plan for the second fort included two armored turrets with two 28 cm SK L/45 guns each. Lighter quick-firing guns and machine guns were planned for close defense. The decision to build the new fort was postponed multiple times. In 1917, the government did make a proposal for a new lock and widening the canal. This again made the need for a new fort clear. Multiple proposals were made, but the high cost and insecurity about the best solution prevented an agreement.

Although obsolete in 1914, the fortress was mobilized when war seemed imminent.

=== Interbellum and World War II ===
In 1929, a new branch of the North Sea Canal was dug just north of the fort. This made that it came to lay an island. During World War II, the German was quick to remove the guns and armored cupola to reuse the metal. The armored gallery remained behind, because it was difficult to safely remove it.In 1942, the fort became part of the Atlantikwall. 37 concrete bunkers were built on the island, and it got artillery with a range of 18 km.

=== After World War II ===
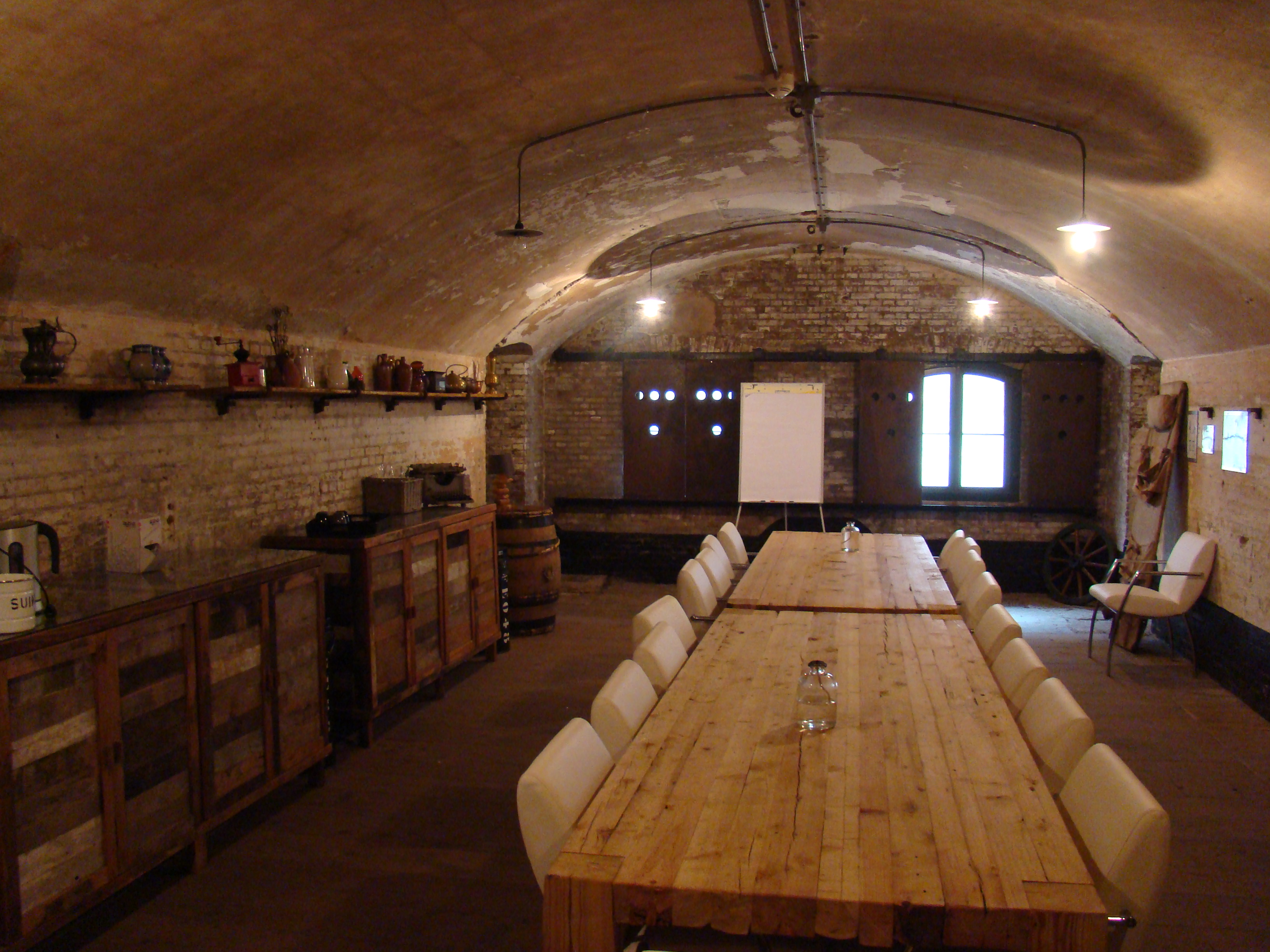
Current interior

In 1963, Fort IJmuiden was the last fort of the Stelling van Amsterdam to lose its military function. In 1967, the North Sea Canal was made wider, leading to the destruction of two thirds of the island. Most of the German bunkers were blown up, but the fort itself survived relatively unscathed.

In 1996, the Stelling van Amsterdam became listed as UNESCO world heritage and was subsequently restored. Since 2008, Fort IJmuiden is leased by PBN Sport & Adventure BV. PBN arranges company events and team trainings.
