= 24 cm MRK L/25 =

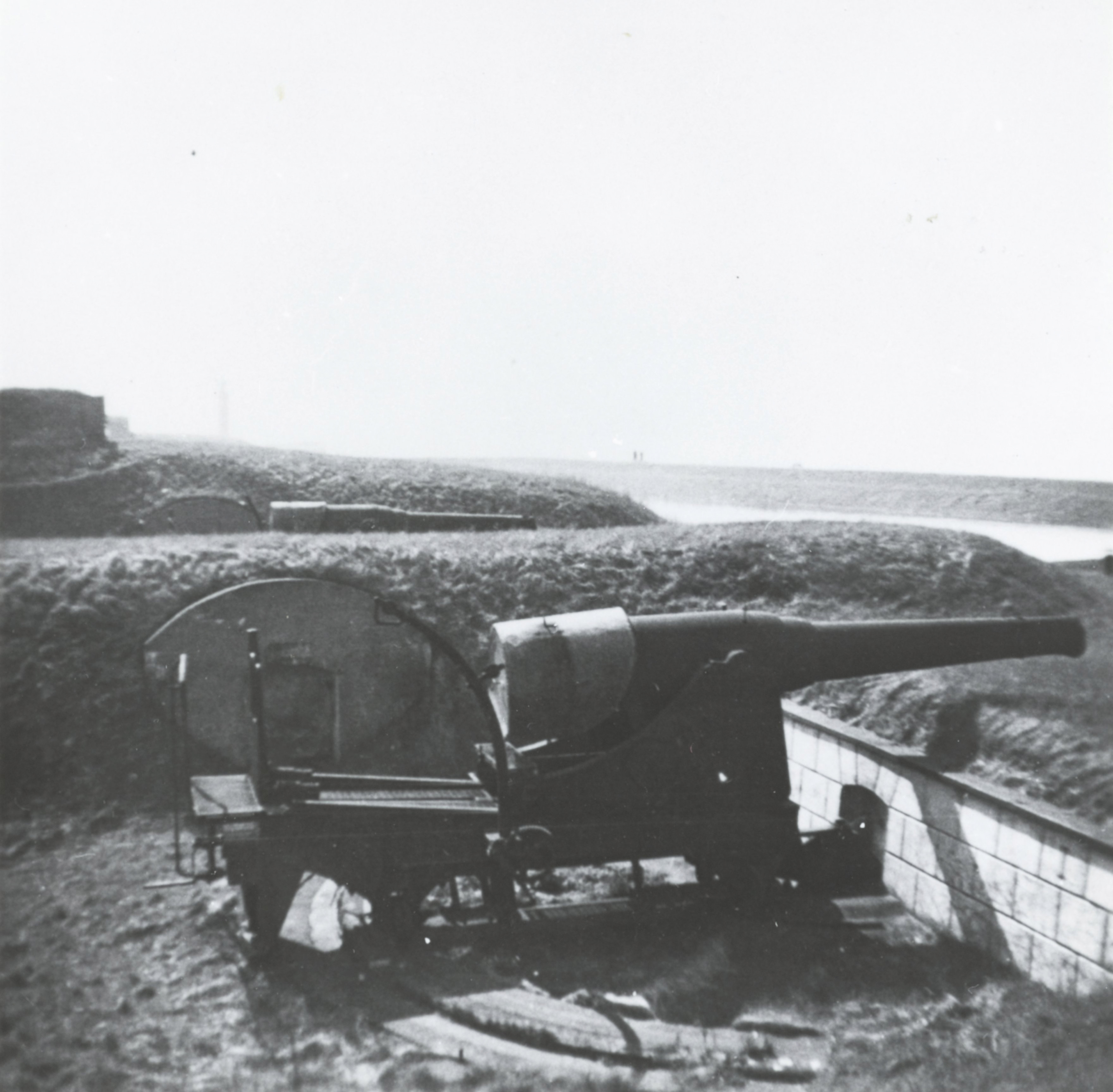
- Near Hellevoetsluis in early 1940
- Place of origin: German Empire

Service history
- Used by: Netherlands

Production history
- Designer: Krupp
- Designed: 1875
- Manufacturer: Krupp
- Produced: 1876
- No. built: 14 (at least)

Specifications
- Mass: 17,000 kg
- Length: 6,000 mm (L/25)
- Caliber: 240 mm
- Muzzle velocity: 473 m/s (161 kg) 481 m/s (125 kg)

The 24 cm MRK L/25 known in the Netherlands as 24 cm lang 25 was a 24 cm 25 caliber long Dutch coastal gun built by Krupp. It was a rifled breech loader built-up gun with a Krupp cylindroprismatic sliding breech. It included some significant innovations and its prototype appeared at the 1876 Centennial Exposition in Philadelphia.

== Context ==
=== The German 24 cm RK L/22 ===
In late 1868, Krupp got the order to design a longer version of the 24 cm K L/20 which had proven so successful in the tests against British muzzleloaders. This led to the two caliber longer langes 24 cm Ringrohr. It later became known as the 24 cm RK L/22.

The caliber of this German 24 cm RK L/22 was 235.4 mm. Its length was 5.230 m. Weight including the breech block was 15,500 kg. The length in calibers was 5.230 m / 0.2354 mm = L/22. A notable feature of the 24 cm RK L/22 was its long twist length of L/70, meaning that its projectiles rotated relatively slowly.

=== Dutch coastal defence ===
In the 1860s, the Netherlands were willing to spend a significant amount of money on coastal defence. One of the guns that it primarily selected for this task was the 24 cm ijzer, an iron rifled breech loader based on a French 1864-1868 design. This decision was based on that it seemed to suffice against most ships, and that its price was only one-third of the Krupp 24 cm gun. This was especially relevant because the Dutch budget already limited the number of guns that could be bought.

The 24 cm iron gun soon turned out to be too weak for most of its intended role. In 1875 an influential Dutch artillery expert concluded that effective heavy coastal artillery guns could only be made from cast steel. At about that time, the Dutch government then went to search for a more capable 24 cm gun.

== The 24 cm MRK L/22 ==
=== The Dutch order a 24 cm MRK L/22 gun ===
The 24 cm MRK L/22 came about when the Dutch ordered a new version of the existing 24 cm RK L/22. In the early 1870s, the Dutch government noted the exceptional power of the Krupp breechloading guns and the high velocity with which these fired their projectiles. It then decided to order and test a steel 24 cm cannon at Krupp. The first trace of this gun can be found in a budget for 1875, which allotted 303,000 guilders for 10 iron(!) 24 cm guns of 30,300 guilders each and 32,000 guilders for 64,000 kg of gunpowder.

The 1874 budget basically had nothing to do with our steel 24 cm gun. However, as not all of the iron guns that were delivered were accepted, the allotted sums were not spent entirely. In 1876, the Minister of War then issued a rather vague statement that the sums for a single steel 24 cm gun had been allowed on the 1875 and 1876 budgets. These had not been spent entirely due to the supplier failing to deliver one gun, the gunpowder tests not finishing in time, and the guns mentioned on the 1876 budget not getting delivered in time. In summary, when the manufacturer of the iron guns failed to deliver everything, the minister used the remaining budget for the iron guns to order the single steel 24 cm gun at Krupp. The 1876 budget indeed showed 10 steel 24 cm guns at 64,814 guilders a piece, including carriage and other necessities. This is inline with the sum of the cost of one iron gun and the cost of the 64,000 kg of gunpowder.

=== Tested at Visbeck (Dülmen) ===
In December 1875, the Dutch 24 cm MRK L/22 gun was tested at Krupp's artillery range in Visbeck, near Dülmen. During these tests, the gun fired a 125 kg regular grenade with a charge of 33 kg. It also fired a 161 kg steel grenade with a charge of 38 kg. Velocities were 470.7 and 461 m/s. The peak gas pressures measured were 2,183 and 2,607 atm.

The results were so positive, that the Dutch decided to order 10 guns of a slightly modified model that was L/25 long. It was expected that based on these tests, the longer version that was ordered would attain an about 20 m/s higher velocity.

=== The Philadelphia 24 cm L/22 gun ===
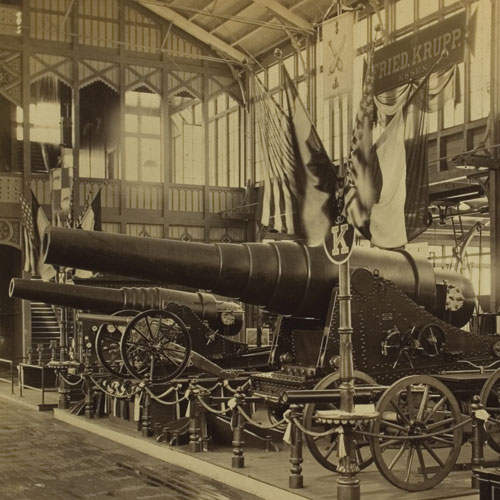
In the background at the 1876 Philadelphia exhibition

The gun that had been tested in December 1875 was exhibited at the Philadelphia Centennial Exposition. While the 35.5 cm MRK L/22.5 made headlines, the much lighter 24 cm gun did not, but it was duly noted by artillery experts.

Ona author noted the differences between this gun and the older 24 cm RK L/22. The Philadelphia gun already had the 240 mm caliber instead of 235.4 mm. It was of the same length, but weighed a bit more: 15,750 instead of 15,500 kg, It already had 54 parallel grooves instead of 32 wedge grooves. The twist length had decreased from L/70 to L/45 and the weight of the projectiles had increased up to 16%.

The charge for the steel and chilled iron grenades had increased by almost 60%, that for the percussion grenade by 65%. Velocity for the steel grenade had increased from 430 to 470 m/s. For the chilled iron this was 423 to 465 m/s, and for the regular grenade velocity increased from 424 to 470 m/s.

The conclusion was that the effectiveness of the Philadelphia L/22 in relation to the existing 24 cm RK L/22 was about 1.4 : 1.

With regard to Krupp exhibiting the gun in Philadelphia, one can assume that with the Dutch order of 10 L/25 guns, Krupp took ownership of the test gun. This is implied, because there is a statement that the Dutch government ordered the construction and the test of the gun at Visbeck. This is also implied by the Dutch and Krupp having agreed on a price, but then adjusting the price because the guns were lengthened. It would then become very unsuitable for the Dutch to have one short 24 cm gun and 10 long ones.

On the other hand, for Krupp it made sense to take ownership of the test gun. The abovementioned trials with regular and steel grenades numbered 113 and 118 shots. That is, the tests had shown that the new 24 cm L/22 could be used with a charge of 38 kg of gunpowder.

=== A Mantel Ring Kanone ===
In 1875, Krupp started to build Mantel Ring Kanonen (MRK), which were like Ring Kanone (RK), but they also had a thin but very strong inner tube. This made them 'hooped and jacketed' instead of only hooped like the Ring Kanone. The Mantel Ring Kanone were about 20% stronger than the earlier Ring Kanone.

With regard to the punch of the steel shot of the Philadelphia 24 cm gun, it was noted that per kg of its weight, this was 110.8^{kg.m} as opposed to 82.0^{kg.m} for the 24 cm RK L/22. It was also noted that this number of 110.8 was inline with that of 'all known guns of the third construction period' of the Krupp factory, 'like the 35.5 cm MRK L/22.5 and the 15 cm siege gun'. It was therefore plausible that the relative peak pressures in these guns were equivalent.

Von Holleben noted that in the mid-1870s, the average velocity of guns increased from 440 to 480 m/s. This led Krupp to change its system to a new system that could be called c/76. Its guns were made for projectiles using copper driving bands as invented by Vavasseur and for using gunpowder of 1.75 density.

Von Holleben also noted that the existing guns were then changed by boring them out and inserting a new inner tube that was configured for the above changes. It led to a whole series of changed guns; i.e. of 12.5, 15, 24, and 26 cm caliber. Von Holleben did not say when these changes were made, but opens up the possibility that the Philadelphia gun was a Mantel Ring Kanone because it had been changed in this way.

== The 24 cm MRK L/25 ==
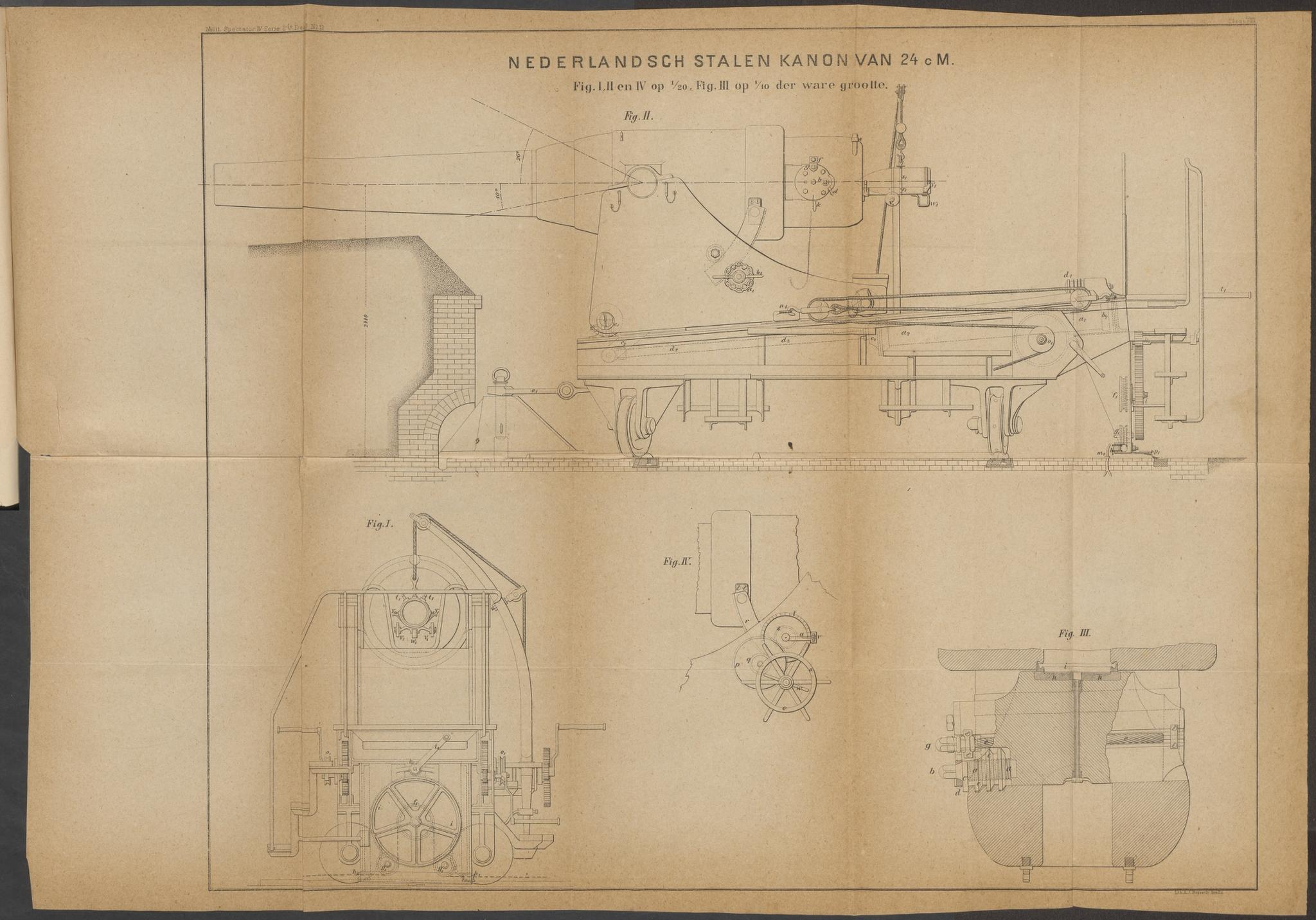
The Dutch 24 cm MRK L/25 on a coastal carriage

As noted above, the December 1875 tests at Visbeck prompted the Dutch government to place an order for ten 24 cm MRK guns that were somewhat longer than the 24 cm MRK L/22. It led to the 24 cm MRK L/25 and meant that the original budget for the guns had to be increased a bit.

An open end for the 24 cm MRK L/25 was the kind of gunpowder that the Dutch would use. This was a matter that greatly influenced the performance of a gun. Krupp would of course recommend its own gunpowder that had been used in the tests. However, there were other considerations, like whether it could be produced locally. In 1875 the Dutch decided that they would test prismatic and pebble (keisteenbuskruit) gunpowder produced in Muiden for use with the iron 24 cm gun. These tests were finished in April 1877. The test commission then recommended to use pebble gunpowder of 1.77-1.79 density for use with the iron gun if this kind of gunpowder could also be used with the steel gun.

In July 1877, the 24 cm MRK L/25 was put in position at the beach of Scheveningen. The test commission would investigate whether the regular 125 kg projectile would attain a required velocity of at least 475 m/s with a gas pressure below 2,200 atm. For the steel grenade of 161 kg, this would have to be at least 465 m/s with a gas pressure below 2,700 atm. Contrary to expectations, the gunpowder recommended for the iron gun did not suffice for the steel gun, because gas pressures in the gun became too high.

The commission then decided to try pebble gunpowder of about 1.80 density. With pebble gunpowder of 1.797 density, results were quite good. However, the commission also wanted to test with Krupp's prismatic gunpowder. The result was that with a charge of 38 kg, prismatic gunpowder gave a velocity of 463.8 m/s, while the new 1.80 pebble gunpowder gave 465.3 m/s at a somewhat higher pressure.

The test commission then proposed that both the steel and the iron 24 cm gun would use pebble powder of 1.81-1.83 density. For the steel gun, the charge would be 39 kg for the 161 kg steel grenade and 33 kg for the regular grenade of 125 kg. These proposals were approved. The commission also proposed to make ballistic tables based on these choices.

== Characteristics ==
=== Barrel ===
The gun barrel was 6,000 mm or L/25 long. The part that stretched from the back of the barrel to the back of the powder chamber contained the breech and was 720 mm long. The powder chamber was 975 mm long and had a diameter of 246.6 mm. The transitional cone to the projectile chamber was 49 mm long. The rifled projectile chamber was 280 mm long. The forcing cone was 17 mm long.

The rifled part of the barrel was 3,959 mm long. It contained 54 parallel grooves that were 9.9 mm wide and 1.5 mm deep. The lands in between were 4 mm wide. The twist length was 45 calibers, meaning the projectile rotated every 10.8 m.

The barrel weighed 17,000 kg. At the ring over the 'jacket' the diameter was 1,020 mm. At the unringed part of the base that held the breech, diameter was 785 mm. At the muzzle, diameter was 365 mm.

A comparison with the 24 cm RK L/22 shows that the caliber of the gun had changed from 235.4 mm to 240 mm. The length had increased from 5,230 mm to 6 m. The powder chamber remained of about the same length. The real and obvious differences were in the rifling, and in the length of the rifled barrel. The weight increased from 15,500 kg to 17,000 kg. The length of the part that held the breech seemed unchanged as was its diameter. The minimal diameter of the part of the barrel that was not ringed had decreased from 392 to 365 mm.

=== Projectiles ===
There were two kinds of projectiles for the 14 cm L/25. Both were 2.8 caliber long. The cast iron grenade weighed 120 kg, excluding 9 kg of explosives, and had a percussion fuze. It was rotated by two copper driving bands. The one in the back had a diameter of 243.2 mm. The front one had a diameter of 240 mm and was only meant for centration.

The empty weight of the armor-piercing steel grenades was 157 kg. They were more conic and very thick at the head. They lacked a percussion fuze. They carried about 4.5 kg of explosives.

=== Velocity ===
Before delivering the new gun, Krupp did some tests in Essen. With a charge of 33 kg, the 125 kg projectile attained a velocity of 493.2 m/s. The 161 kg projectile was tested with several kinds of gunpowder and attained a velocity of over 480 m/s.

After extensive tests (see above), the Dutch decided to use charges of 33 and 39 kg of pebble gunpowder. With a charge of 39 kg, the 161 kg steel grenade reached a velocity of about 473 m/s. For the 125 kg regular grenade this was about 481 m/s.

=== Carriage ===
The carriage made for the Dutch 24 cm L/25 was a coastal carriage. It had an upper carriage that slid over a frame, instead of sliding over the ground. The frame or slide was held in place by a front pivot. The recoil was caught by sliding and rolling drag as well as a hydraulic brake filled with glycerol.

== Use ==
Bij 1882, the Netherlands had 14 24 cm MRK L/25. At that time, the gun was outdated, so no more were added.

== Further development ==
The 24 cm MRK L/25 was a very modern gun when it became available in 1877. However, in December 1878, the prototype gun 24 cm MRK L/25.5 was tested. This used double the charge of the L/25 and had a velocity that was more than 100 m/s higher. The L/25.5 led to longer L/30 and L/35 guns, most of which were tested in 1882. For the 24 cm caliber this led to the 24 cm MRK L/30 which the Netherlands tested in December 1884, and the 24 cm K L/35.
