= 24 cm RK L/22 =

1867 German Navy coastal defence gun

24 cm Ring Kanone L/22
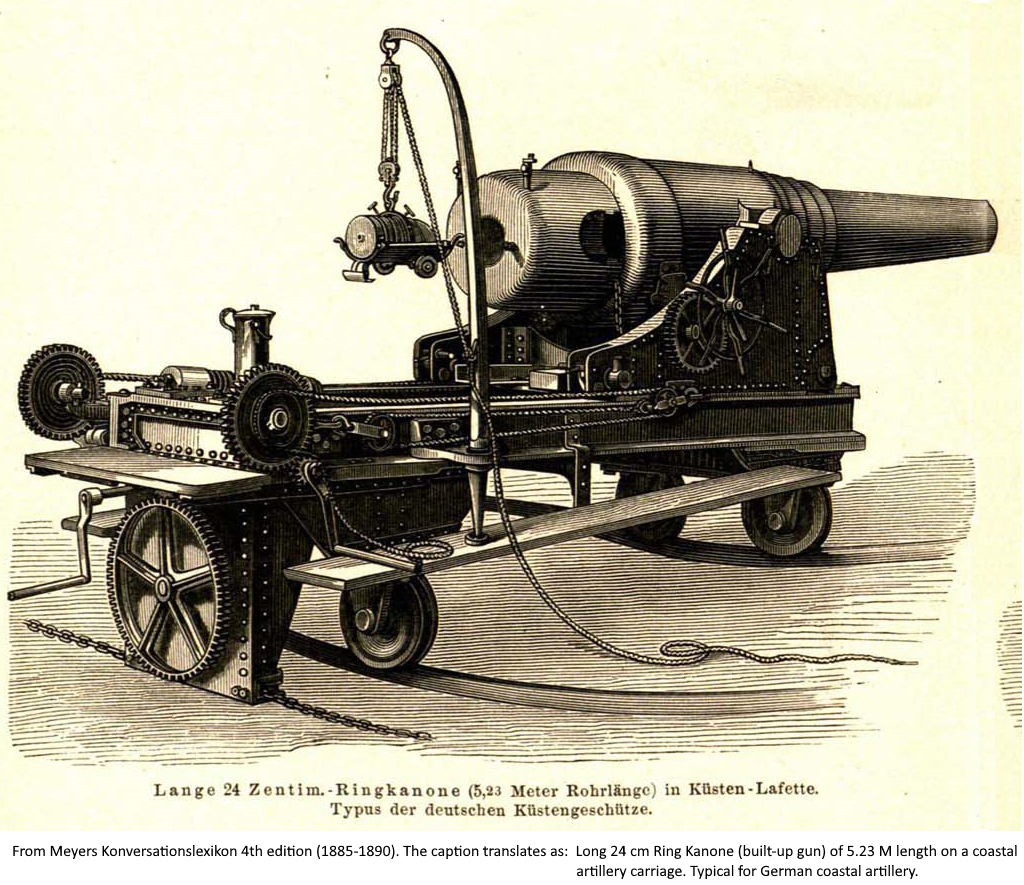
- 24 cm RK L/22 gun in Meyers Konversationslexikon
- Type: Coastal Artillery
- Place of origin: Kingdom of Prussia

Service history
- Used by: Germany; Ottoman empire; Imperial Japanese Navy

Production history
- Designer: Krupp
- Designed: 1867
- Manufacturer: Krupp
- Produced: 1868

Specifications
- Mass: 15,500 kg
- Length: 5.230 m (L/22)
- Caliber: 235.4 mm
- Breech: horizontal sliding wedge
- Muzzle velocity: 458 m/s

The 24 cm RK L/22 was a 24 cm caliber Krupp Ring Kanone (built-up gun) used for coastal defence. It was developed from the earlier rifled breech loader 24 cm K L/20.

== Background ==
In 1868 Prussia performed extensive testing of the 24 cm K L/20. This was its first Ring Kanone, a type of built-up gun. The gun had been ordered with the intention to use it on board SMS König Wilhelm. After these tests had been successfully concluded, the 24 cm K L/20 was indeed used to arm the ship.

Somewhat before mid December 1868, Krupp then got the order to design a longer version of the 24 cm K L/20 but of the same weight. This would become the two caliber longer langes 24 cm Ringrohr. It later became known as the 24 cm RK L/22, see section names and models.

The logic behind making a longer version of the 24 cm K L/20, but of the same weight was probably in the use of the slow burning Pristmatic Gunpowder. The L/20 design had undergone a last minute change to make its use possible. However, it was only during the development of the later 21 cm RK L/19 that the total effects of using this gunpowder became known. One of these was a lower explosive pressure peak. This allows a higher charge or a lighter construction of guns.

The fact that the L/20 was used on board ships and the 24 cm RK L/22 became part of the coastal artillery might have several reasons. In 1867 the Prussian Navy had bought its first three armored ships. In 1868 it was paramount to arm these with something useful. This could explain that the navy immediately ordered the L/20 for König Wilhelm, instead of waiting for a design which incorporated the lessons from the 1868 trials.

== Characteristics ==
=== Ship or coastal gun? ===
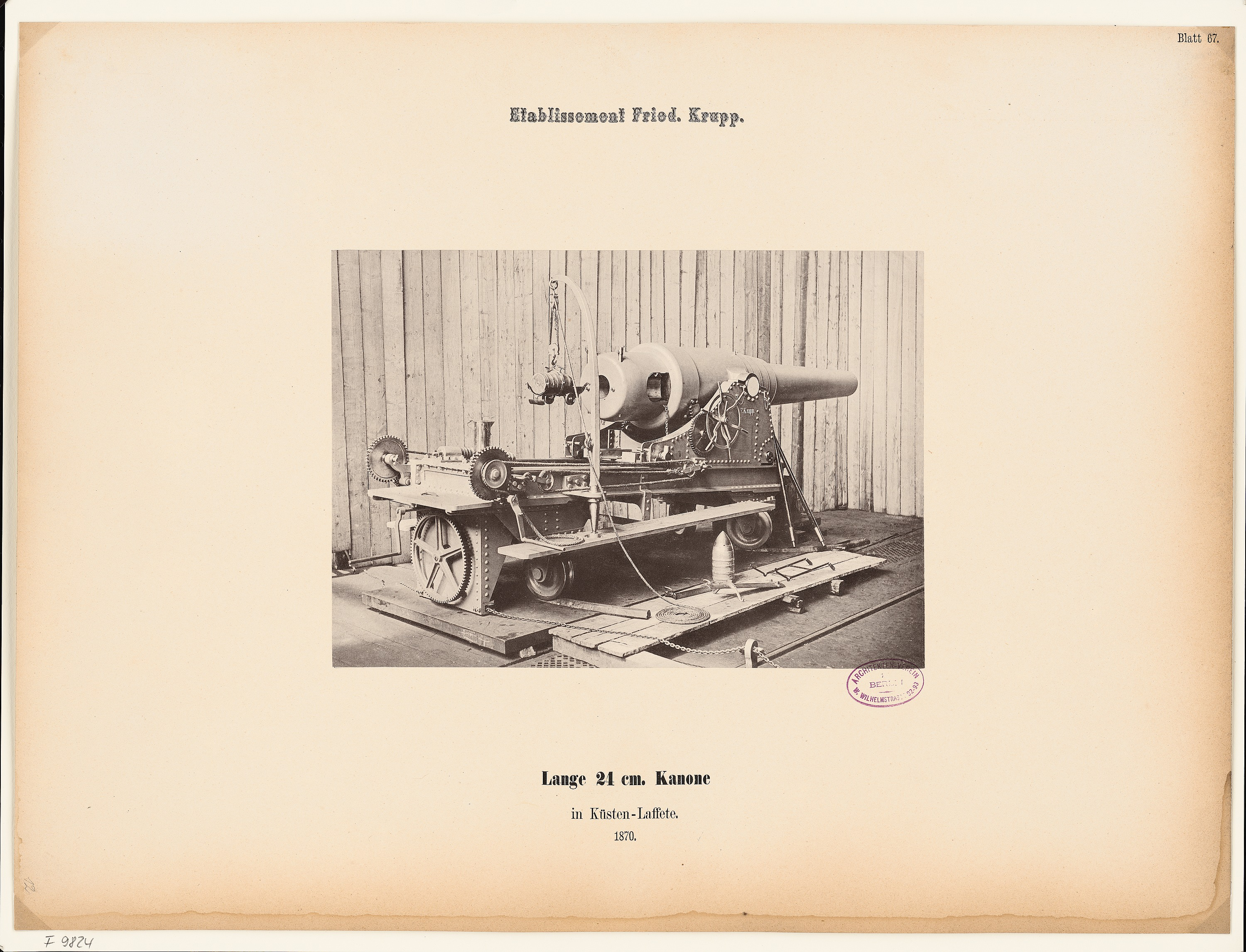
24 cm RK L/22 Krupp gun on coastal carriage in 1870

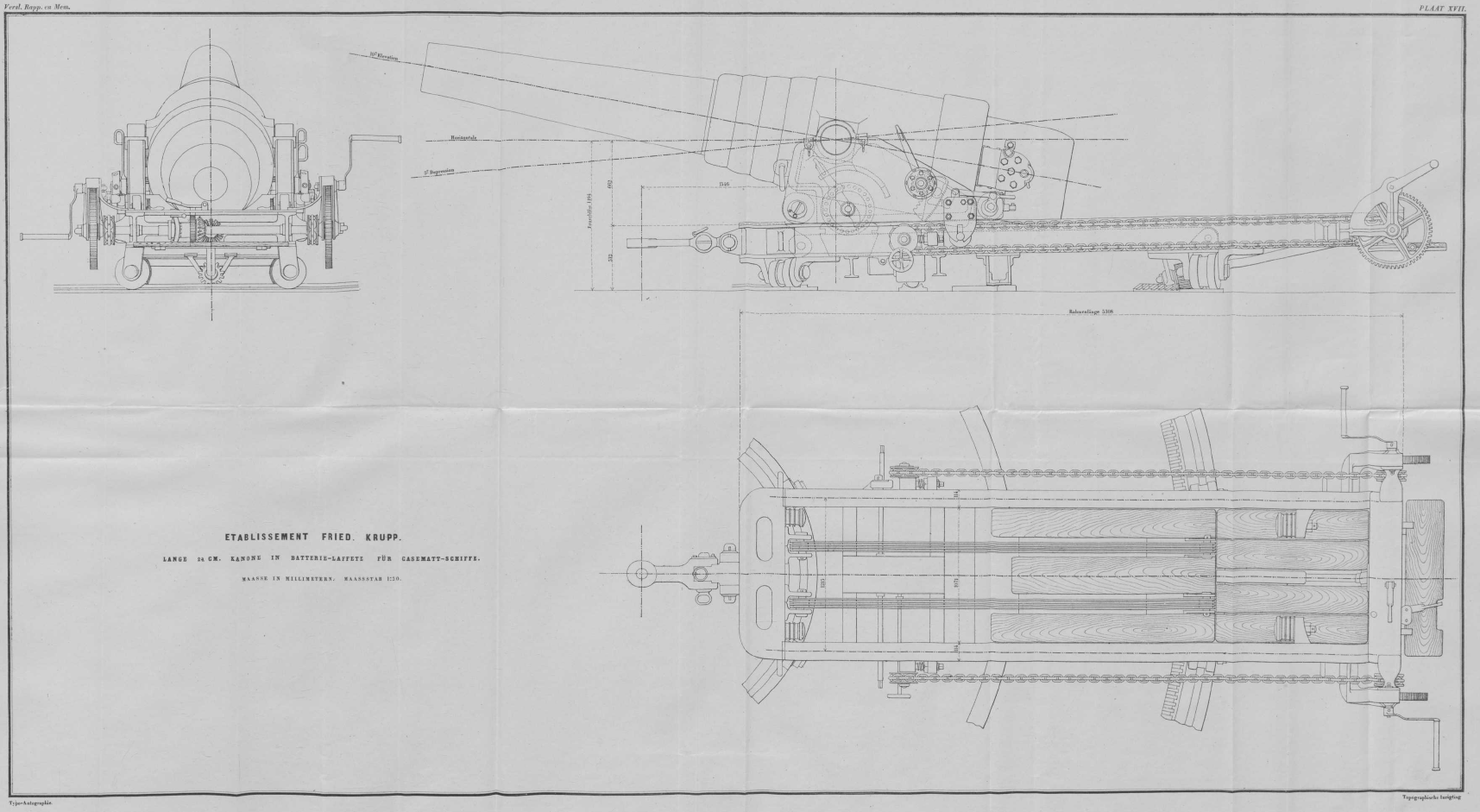
24 cm RK L/22 gun on pivot casemate ship mount

While the 24 cm RK L/22 appears not to have been used on German ships, there was no technical reasons that it could not be used on board. In fact, during the 1873 Vienna World's Fair, Krupp exhibited a 24 cm RK L/22 gun on pivot carriage meant for use on board casemate ships.

A 24 cm L/22 gun was exhibited by Krupp at the 1876 Centennial Exposition Philadelphia. It was also called a 24 cm gun and had the same absolute length as well as a relative length of L/22, but in fact this was a prototype gun that had a caliber of 240 mm and was configured for using an increased charge and projectiles with copper driving bands. It would be lengthened and became the Dutch 24 cm MRK L/25 or 24 cm lang 25.

=== Names and models ===
When it was first made, the 24 cm RK L/22 and the 24 cm K L/20 were held apart by the names 'langer Ring 96-pfdr 200" lang' and 'kurzer Ring 96-pfdr 180" lang' 200* referred to 200 Prussian inch. The term 96-pfdr really meant: of a caliber that can fire a 96-pound round bullet.

In 1871 the Prussian Navy shifted to the metric system. The guns then received the names 'lange 24 cm Ring Kanone' and 'kurze 24 cm Ring Kanone'. (The label 'Ring' was not used here, but later references show that the navy continued to speak of 'Ring Kanone')

A designation system using terms like 'long' and 'short' was not durable at a time when longer models were introduced every couple of years. In 1885 the Prussian Navy already had a 24 cm L/30 gun. That year the lange 24 cm Ring Kanone was renamed '24 cm Ring Kanone L/22' abbreviated: '24 cm RK L/22'. The kurze 24 cm Ring Kanone was renamed '24 cm Kanone L/20' abbreviated: '24 cm K L/20'. Such designation systems are often based on being as concise as possible, but it's not immediately clear why the L/22 retained the 'Ring' label while the L/20 did not.

=== Characteristics of the 24 cm L/22 ===
The design of the 24 cm K L/22 was ordered somewhat before mid December 1868. The order was to design a longer version of the 24 cm K L/20 but of the same weight. Characteristics of the L/22 show that the idea to retain the same weight was not realized.

The 24 cm K L/22 was a rifled breech loader. It had a built-up gun barrel with a cylindroprismatic Krupp horizontal sliding wedge breech block. It used a Broadwell ring for obturation.

The caliber was 235.4 mm. This amounted to 9 Prussian inches of 26.154 mm. Overall length was 5.230 m. Weight including breech was 15,500 kg. The breech block itself weighed 625 kg. The length in calibers was 5.230 m / 0.2354 mm = L/22.

There was a single carriage for the gun: the 24 cm Küsten Laffete C/69. Its fire height was 204 cm.The carriage could elevate the gun to 20 degrees, and decline it up to 6 degrees. The elevation system was a Zahnbogen. The total weight of the carriage was 9,212 kg. It had a hydraulic break to dampen recoil.

The ammunition that the 24 cm K L/22 could fire was: 24 cm grenade C/69; 24 cm Hartgussgranate C/69; and 24 cm Kartätsche.

== Use as coastal artillery ==
=== German coastal artillery ===
On 22 April 1869, the Prussian Artillerie Prüfungskommission (artillery test commission) issued a report on the caliber system for the coastal artillery. It found that the difference in effect between the 21 cm Ring Kanone and the 24 cm Ring Kanone was too small to justify the inclusion of the 24 cm caliber in the system. Therefore, no new Ring Kanone of 24 cm were to be ordered for the coastal artillery. Instead, it opted for a 27 cm caliber, which resulted in the use of the 28 cm RK L/22 in the coastal artillery.

We know that in 1885, the 24 cm RK L/22 was not used on board ships, but was used in the coastal artillery.

=== Turkish coastal artillery ===
Turkey ordered 50 24 cm RK L/22 for its coastal artillery in 1873. The first 5 of these were delivered in 1874.

=== Japanese Navy ===
The Japanese ironclad Fusō had four 24 cm RK L/22 and two 17 cm RK L/25.
