= 15 cm MRK L/30 =

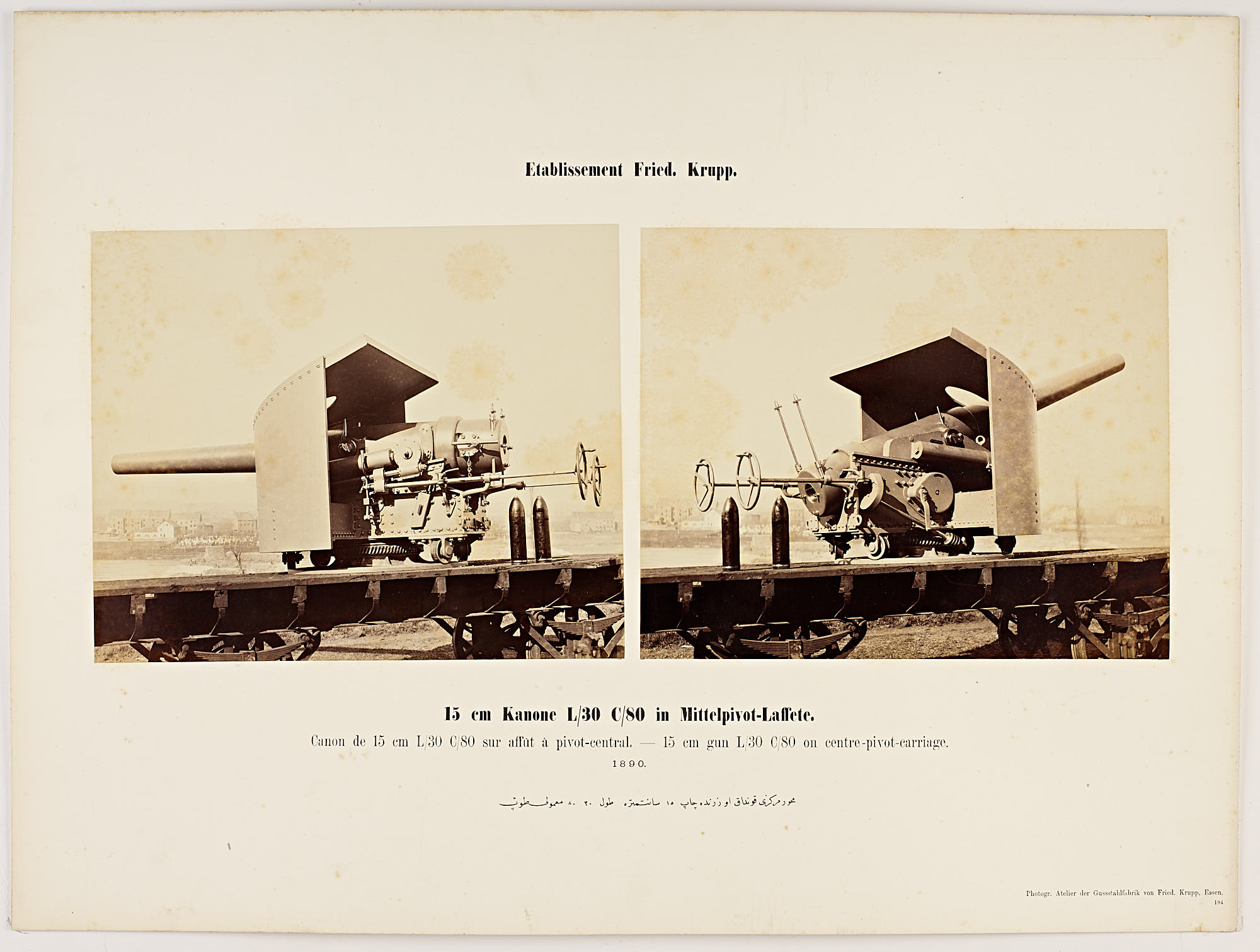
- A 15 cm MRK L/30 C/80 in 1890
- Place of origin: German Empire

Service history
- Used by: German Empire; Denmark; Netherlands

Production history
- Designer: Krupp
- Designed: 1880
- Manufacturer: Krupp
- Produced: 1882
- No. built: at least 28

Specifications
- Mass: 4,100 kg
- Length: 4,470 mm mm
- Caliber: 149.1 mm
- Muzzle velocity: 495 m/s

The 15 cm Mantel Ring Kanone L/30, known as 15 cm Kanone L/30 was a 15 cm 30 caliber long Krupp Mantel Ring Kanone (MRK). It was a rifled breech loader built-up gun with a Krupp cylindroprismatic sliding breech. It was based on the later models of the 15 cm RK L/26, a 15 cm MRK L/28, and a 15.24 cm (6 inch) predecessor. This predecessor was the first of a new series of 30 and 35 caliber long guns that Krupp made to profit from a slower burning gunpowder invented in the early 1870s.

== Context ==
In the race of ship armor against ship artillery, the primary course of action of the artillery manufacturers was to increase the caliber of their guns. As a second option, they attempted to increase the velocity to which the projectiles were propelled. This boiled down to increasing the charge of guns. There were several reasons why significantly increasing the charge of existing guns was very difficult.

One of the main problems that had to be overcome to increase the effectiveness of guns, was that an increase of the charge leads to an increase of the peak atmospheric pressure inside a gun. In other words, simply increasing charge of an existing gun leads to increased wear, and sooner or later, the bursting of the gun barrel. The first series of Krupp Ring Kanone overcame this problem by using the so-called Prismatic Pulver c/68 (P.P. c/68), a kind of gunpowder that burned slower than traditional gunpowder. This is also called less-offensive.

In the 1870s, manufacturing a less-offensive gunpowder could be done. The real challenge was in quality control. Gunpowder batches from the same manufacturer and having the same specifications could lead to differences in average atmospheric pressure of 200-300 Atm. This made it very hard to develop a reliable less offensive kind of gunpowder. In January 1872 the management of the Spandau gunpowder factory started to experiment with a kind of gunpowder that would finally lead to the even less offensive P.P. c/75 which had a density of 1.75 and only one channel. In October 1875, the Allgemeines Kriegs Departement approved its use under the P.P. c/75 designation.

== Related, earlier guns ==
=== The 15 cm RK L/26 ===
By 1874, the German Navy already had a relatively long gun with a high velocity, the 15 cm RK L/26. This had seen a problematic development. After first getting ordered in 1869, its rifling and driving bands were only determined in 1873/74. By 1875, the latest Krupp innovations were the Mantel Ring Kanone construction, copper driving bands, parallel grooves, and a rifled chamber.

In July 1878, a 15 cm L/26 gun was tested at the Krupp artillery range in Meppen. Known differences with the original 15 cm RK L/26 were: the rifled chamber, the 36 parallel grooves with 3.5 mm wide lands, copper driving bands, and a progressive twist length of 6.71 m (L/45). A shorter MRK (the 15 cm MRK L/22) had been ordered in Summer 1877. One can therefore suppose that this L/26 was also a Mantel Ring Kanone (hooped & jacketed), but this is not certain.

The projectiles fired by the 15 cm L/26 during this test weighed 31.5 kg. The charge was 9.5 kg of roughly granulated (pebble) powder of 13–16 mm or 8.5 kg of prismatic powder with 7 channels and a density of 1.64. The velocity measurement failed. However, from a May 1878 test it was known to be 500–514 m/s. The other guns at this test (35.5 cm MRK L/25, 30.5 cm MRK L/25, and 28 cm MRK L/22) used gunpowder with a density of 1.75 and one channel, which conforms to P.P. C/75.

The July 1878 test showed that Krupp first lengthened its heavy 35.5 and 30.5 cm guns to profit from the new P.P. C/75 type of less offensive gunpowder. This could be related to Krupp's attempt to create a 15 cm armored gun, the so-called Panzerkanone. This was tested as a 15 cm gun in 1877 and also in July 1878, when it had a caliber of 15.5 cm. Both tests took place in Bredelar.

=== The 15 cm MRK L/28 ===
Designing a 15 cm MRK for a heavier charge sounds easier than it was. If the charge of the gun was to be higher, the chamber of the gun had to be lengthened to give the gunpowder the same relative space to expand. Therefore, increasing the charge by itself would increase the length of the gun. If the charge was increased by using less offensive gunpowder, then it was very likely that the projectile would leave the barrel before all the gunpowder has exploded. Therefore, the barrel had to be lengthened on both sides to fully profit from less offensive gunpowder.

When the July 1878 tests took place, the regular length of projectiles was 2.8 or at most 3 calibers long. It was clear that longer, i.e. heavier projectiles would have more punch than shorter ones. Longer projectiles would also loose less velocity due to drag than lighter ones. However, longer projectiles were prone to be misformed in the barrel, to have an unsure flight, or to hit at a wrong angle. Longer projectiles also required a stronger charge, a faster twist rate, and a stronger carriage. The latter because of the higher and or longer recoil. Taken together this meant that effective use of longer projectiles required a totally new design.

In December 1878, Krupp had a 15 cm L/28 gun ready. It weighed 3,960 kg and had a progressive twist rate of 25 calibers or 3.73 m (giving the projectile a faster twist). In January 1879, it fired a 4 caliber long 50 kg grenade with a charge of 15.5 kg of gunpowder of 1.75 density. Velocity was about 510 m/s, but if the older lighter grenades were used this could become 630 m/s.

During 1879, the 15 cm MRK L/28 proved the theory that longer projectiles were very useful, especially because these did not lose their punch at a distance. In August 1879, the 15 cm L/28 was tested in Meppen. With strong winds of 7.64 m/s the longer projectiles proved to remain accurate. The gun fired an armor piercing grenade of 51 kg at a velocity of 509 m/s and a regular grenade of 40 kg at 559 m/s. At 1,979 m from the muzzle the former had a velocity of 395 m/s, the latter had 396 m/s.

=== The 15.24 cm MRK L/30 ===
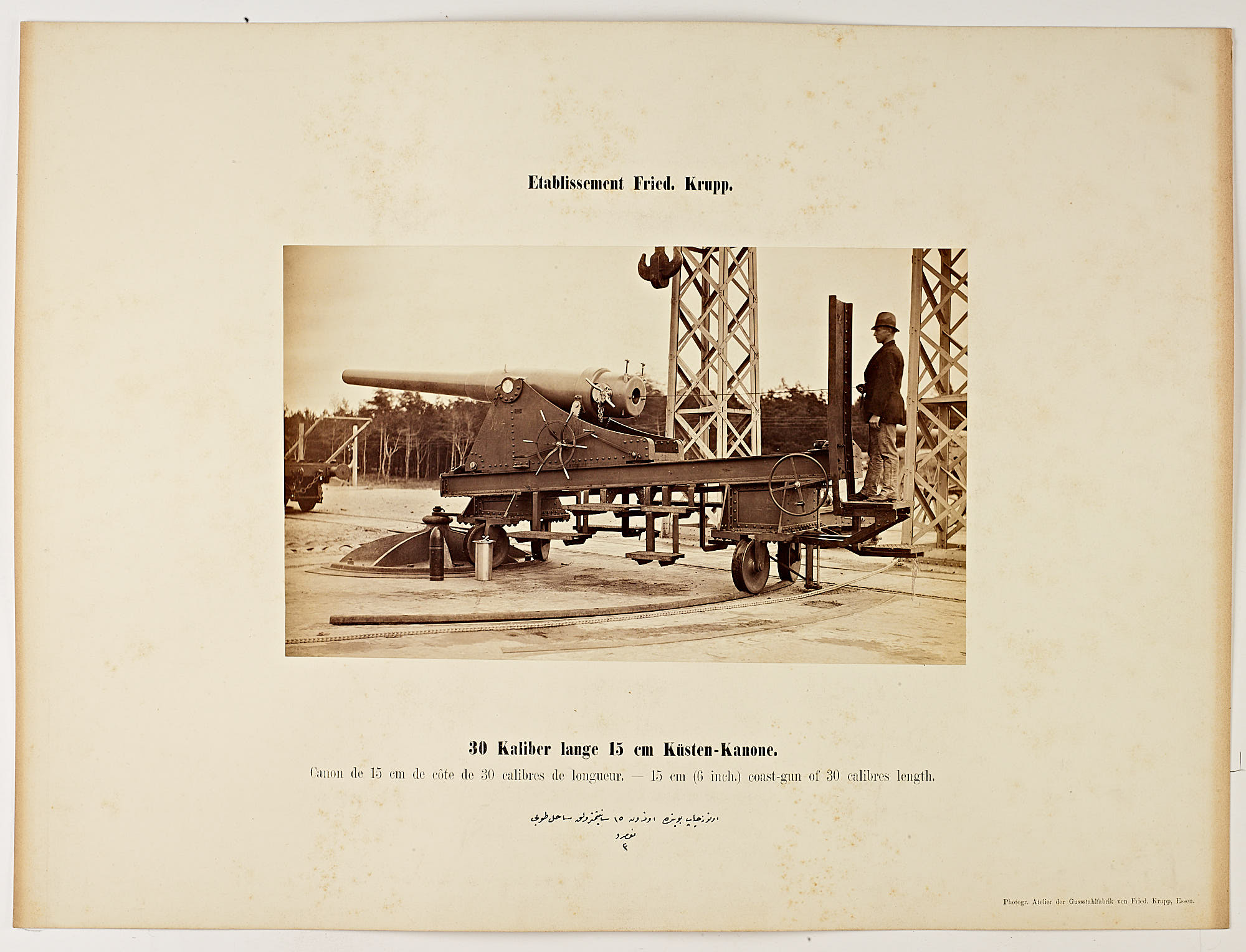
15.24 cm (6 inch) MRK L/30

Based on the results of tests with smaller guns, the 15 cm L/28 and the 25 caliber long guns of larger calibers, Krupp designed a whole new system of 30 and 35 caliber long guns, the so-called Construction 1880 or c/80. The 15 cm guns would have a caliber of 14.91 cm and would come in a two 25 caliber versions, a 30 caliber version, and a 35 caliber long version.

However, the first 15 cm L/30 gun that Krupp actually made had a caliber of 152.4 mm (i.e. 6"). Its consistent name could have been 15 cm MRK L/30. There were several possible grounds why Krupp first made a 15 cm L/30 gun: The 15 cm caliber was in general use on ships and as a coastal gun; It was only a small step from the L/28; and a 15 cm L/30 could be made easier and with less cost than a heavier gun.

The strange caliber of 15.24 cm was not in line with the 14.91 cm of the c/80 system. There were suspicions that Krupp chose the caliber to provide a clear comparison to a new British 6 inch gun. However, it is not that clear that Krupp designed this gun after the c/80 system had been designed. In 1884, both seem to appear in an overview as: '30 Kaliber lange 15 cm Kanone'. One of them has the suffix C/80 and fired a 51 kg projectile. The gun without the suffix fired a 50 kg projectile. It is also possible that something went wrong while boring / rifling a 14.91 cm gun, and that it was simply bored up to the next logical caliber.

The new 15.24 cm MRK L/30 had a caliber of 152.4 mm (i.e. 6"). It was 4,600 mm long (L/30) with a length of bore of 4,180 mm (L/27.5). The chamber was rifled. It had 36 parallel grooves with a progressive twist rate of 3.81 m or L/25. Its weight including the breech was 4,200 kg.

In July 1880, this gun was tested in Meppen. It fired a 50 kg grenade with a velocity of about 520 m/s. A 35 kg grenade was fired with a velocity of about 615 m/s.

=== The 15 cm MRK L/35 ===
In March 1882, Krupp tested a 35 caliber long 15 cm MRK L/35 in Meppen. It fired 3.35 caliber long armor piercing grenades and 4 caliber long explosive grenades. Each weighed 51 kg. The charge was 17 kg of gunpowder with a density of 1.75 and a single channel. Velocity was about 535 m/s. The 15 cm MRK L/35 again had the regular Krupp caliber of 14.91 cm.

== The 15 cm MRK L/30 ==
When Krupp tested the 30.5 cm MRK L/35 and the 15 cm MRK L/35 in March 1882, there was no L/30 present. A specific mention of a 15 cm L/30 gun noted that a 152.4 mm caliber gun had been tested. Therefore, we have to look for the development and first test of the 15 cm MRK L/30 in the timeframe between March 1882 and February 1883.

=== Testing brown gunpowder ===
On 27 February 1883, a 15 cm MRK L/30 was tested in Meppen. It used about 16.5 kg of the new 'brown prismatic gunpowder C/82'. The projectiles it fired weighed about 51.5 kg. With high charges, velocity was between 524 and 549 m/s. The gas pressure inside the gun was between 2,265 and 2,705 Atm.

On 8 May 1883 further tests took place in Meppen. This time the caliber of 149.1 mm was explicitly mentioned. The gun fired 5 projectiles weighing 51 kg with a charge of 15 kg of brown gunpowder C/82. Velocity was 505 m/s at the muzzle and 392 m/s at 2,000 m. Gas pressure was between 2,280 and 2,500 Atm. The same ballistic results could be reached by using 16 kg of C/75, but then peak gas pressure was about 200Atm higher.

=== In the German navy ===
In 1885, the 15 cm MRK L/30 appeared in a list of the German navy's guns as 15 cm Kanone L/30, abbreviated 15 cm K. L/30.

=== Labels ===
In the German navy, the 15 cm MRK L/30 was known as 15 cm Kanone L/30, abbreviated 15 cm K. L/30. At the time, the Mantel Ring Kanone construction was the latest. Therefore, in 1885 all Mantel Ring Kanone were relabelled as 'Kanone'. E.g. the 15 cm MRK L/22 became the '15 cm Kanone L/22'. The older Ring Kanone retained the label 'Ring Kanone'. About 8 years later, something similar happened. When the quick-firing Mantel Ring Kanone or 'Schnellade Kanone' were introduced, the newer guns received the 'Schnellade Kanone' or 'SK' label, while the older ones retained the 'Kanone' label.

== Characteristics ==
=== The gun ===
The 15 cm MRK L/30 barrel had a caliber of 149.1 mm and weighed 4,100 kg, including the breech block of 420 kg. The barrel was 4,470 mm long. There were 36 parallel grooves of 1.5 mm depth and 9.5 mm width. The lands were 3.5 mm wide. The progressive twist rate was L/25, meaning that the projectile made a complete turn while travelling that distance.

The barrel had a length of bore of 4,050 mm. From the back, this consisted of: The unrifled part of the chamber, where the charge was placed, this was 650 mm long. Next came an Ubergangskonus of 139 mm. The length of the rifled part of the chamber was again 650 mm. The rest of the barrel was 2,611 mm long.

=== Carriage ===
The 15 cm MRK L/30 was mounted on the 15 cm Rahmen Lafette C/83 and the 15 cm Mittel Pivot Lafette C/83. The 15 cm Rahmen Lafette C/83 was a slide carriage, the upper part weighed 890 kg, this stood on a slide of 1,270 kg. When the gun was fired, the recoil moved the upper carriage back on the slide, which contained a brake. The firing height was 965 mm. Elevation up to 15 degrees, declination 6 degrees.

The 15 cm Mittel Pivot Lafette C/83 was also a sliding carriage. The difference was that the slide was turned on a pivot near its center, instead of near the muzzle of the gun. The firing height was 1,095 mm. Elevation was up to 20 degrees, declination 5 degrees.

=== Projectiles ===
The 15 cm MRK L/30 could fire the old 2.8 caliber long projectiles as well as the new 3.5-4.5 calibers long grenades.

Early on, the 15 cm MRK L/30 used the 15 cm Granate L/4 (or Granate C/82), and the Stahlgranate L/3.5 (or Stahlgranate C/82). These were shot with a charge of 15 kg of Prismatic Pulver C/75. The projectiles weighed 51 kg and had a conic driving band without indentation and had a centration wart. The German navy used a charge of 15 kg of P.P. C/75. With that charge, velocity was 495 m/s.

Later, the 15 cm MRK L30 C/80 used a charge of 17 kg. With that charge, the light L/2.8 steel grenade attained a velocity of 590 m/s. The heavy L/4 attained a velocity of 525 m/s.

== Use ==
=== German Navy ===
In 1897 the Carola-class corvettes SMS Arcona and SMS Alexandrine still had 15 cm Mantel Ring Kanonen L/30.

The Irene-class cruisers originally had six 15 cm Mantel Ring Kanonen L/30, and eight 15 cm MRK L/22. By about by 1897 these had been replaced by four 15 cm SK L/30, eight 10.5 cm SK L/30, and six 5 cm SK L/40 gun.

Apart from this, it is known that some older 15 cm guns were changed to become 15 cm MRK L/30.

=== German Army ===
In time, the ships that mounted the 15 cm MRK L/30 were retired or re-armed. The barrels were obviously stored, because in World War I, some guns were taken out of storage and mounted on simple land carriages. These guns were known as 15 cm Ring Kanone L/30.

=== Danish coastal artillery ===
In the mid-1880s, Denmark acquired 11 15 cm MRK L/30 guns for its coastal artillery. These fired 51 kg armor-piercing grenades. With a charge of 17 kg of brown prismatic gunpowder these acquired a velocity of 540 m/s.

=== Dutch coastal artillery ===
The Dutch coastal artillery, which was part of the army, used the 15 cm MRK L/30 in the coastal Fort IJmuiden and at the coastal Fort Hoek van Holland. In both forts it was placed in an armored cupola.

== Further development ==
In 1885, the 15 cm MRK L/30 and 15 cm MRK L/35 were very efficient guns. This was measured in terms of the punch they delivered in relation to their weight. However, the future was with Quick-firing guns like the 15 cm SK L/35.
