= Fiorillo =

Fiorillo is an Italian-language surname. Notable people with the surname include:

- Elisa Fiorillo (born 1969), American singer
- Federigo Fiorillo (1755–1823), German musician, composer, son of Ignazio Fiorillo
- Ignazio Fiorillo (1715–1787), Italian composer of opera seria
- Johann Dominicus Fiorillo (1748–1821), German painter, son of Ignazio Fiorillo
- Luigi Fiorillo (1847–1898), Italian photographer, active in the Middle East and parts of Africa
- Mario Fiorillo (born 1962), Italian water polo player
- Vincenzo Fiorillo (born 1990), Italian footballer

== See also ==
- Fiorillo, a character in The Barber of Seville by Gioachino Rossini
