= Vlasopoulos =

Vlasopoulos is a Greek surname. Notable people with the surname include:

- Nikolaos Vlasopoulos (born 1988), Greek footballer
- Stylianos Vlasopoulos (1748–1822), Greek noble and senator
