= 1748 =

Calendar year

1748 in various calendars
- Gregorian calendar: 1748; MDCCXLVIII
- Ab urbe condita: 2501
- Armenian calendar: 1197; ԹՎ ՌՃՂԷ
- Assyrian calendar: 6498
- Balinese saka calendar: 1669–1670
- Bengali calendar: 1154–1155
- Berber calendar: 2698
- British Regnal year: 21 Geo. 2 – 22 Geo. 2
- Buddhist calendar: 2292
- Burmese calendar: 1110
- Byzantine calendar: 7256–7257
- Chinese calendar: 丁卯年 (Fire Rabbit); 4445 or 4238 — to — 戊辰年 (Earth Dragon); 4446 or 4239
- Coptic calendar: 1464–1465
- Discordian calendar: 2914
- Ethiopian calendar: 1740–1741
- Hebrew calendar: 5508–5509
- Hindu calendars
- Vikram Samvat: 1804–1805
- Shaka Samvat: 1669–1670
- Kali Yuga: 4848–4849
- Holocene calendar: 11748
- Igbo calendar: 748–749
- Iranian calendar: 1126–1127
- Islamic calendar: 1160–1162
- Japanese calendar: Enkyō 5 / Kan'en 1 (寛延元年)
- Javanese calendar: 1672–1673
- Julian calendar: Gregorian minus 11 days
- Korean calendar: 4081
- Minguo calendar: 164 before ROC 民前164年
- Nanakshahi calendar: 280
- Thai solar calendar: 2290–2291
- Tibetan calendar: མེ་མོ་ཡོས་ལོ་ (female Fire-Hare); 1874 or 1493 or 721 — to — ས་ཕོ་འབྲུག་ལོ་ (male Earth-Dragon); 1875 or 1494 or 722

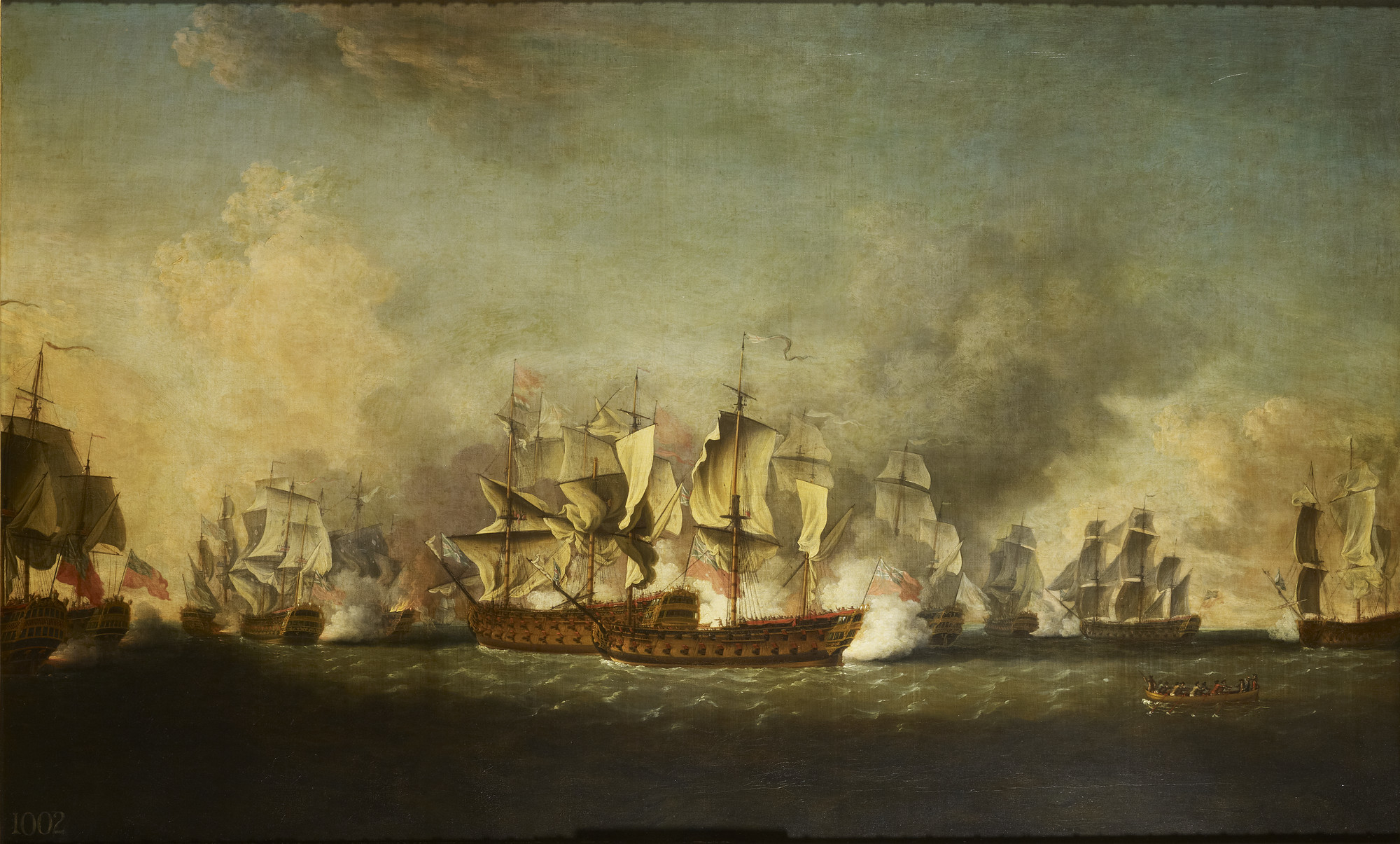
October 12: The Battle of Havana is fought in the Caribbean between Britain's Royal Navy and the Spanish Fleet.(1770 painting by Richard Paton)

1748 (MDCCXLVIII) was a leap year starting on Monday of the Gregorian calendar and a leap year starting on Friday of the Julian calendar, the 1748th year of the Common Era (CE) and Anno Domini (AD) designations, the 748th year of the 2nd millennium, the 48th year of the 18th century, and the 9th year of the 1740s decade. As of the start of 1748, the Gregorian calendar was 11 days ahead of the Julian calendar, which remained in localized use until 1923.

== Events ==
=== January–March ===
- January 12 – Ahmad Shah Durrani captures Lahore.
- January 27 – A fire at the prison and barracks at Kinsale, in Ireland, kills 54 of the prisoners of war housed there. An estimated 500 prisoners are safely conducted to another prison.
- February 7 – The San Gabriel mission project begins with the founding of the first Roman Catholic missions further northward in the Viceroyalty of New Spain, in what is now central Texas. On orders of the Viceroy, Juan Francisco de Güemes, Friar Mariano Marti establish the San Francisco Xavier mission at a location on the San Gabriel River in what is now Milam County. The mission, located northeast of the future site of Austin, Texas, is attacked by 60 Apache Indians on May 2, and San Xavier is abandoned after a few years.
- March 11 – In battle near Manupur (15 kilometres (9.3 mi) northwest of Sirhind), Mughal forces under Prince Ahmad Shah Bahadur are victorious against Ahmad Shah Durrani.
- March 25 – A fire in the City of London starts at Change Alley in Cornhill and continues for two days. Dr. Samuel Johnson later writes, "The conflagration of a city, with all its turmoil and concominant distress, is one of the most dreadful spectacles which this world can afford to human eyes". Another history notes more than a century later that "the fire led to a great increase in the practice of fire insurance", after the blaze causes more than £1,000,000 worth of damage.

=== April–June ===
- April 15 – The Siege of the Dutch fortress of Maastricht is started by the French under the command of Maurice de Saxe as part of the War of the Austrian Succession. The fortress falls on May 7 after a little more than three weeks.
- April 24 – A congress assembles at Aix-la-Chapelle (now Aachen), with the intent to conclude the War of the Austrian Succession. The treaty is signed on October 18.
- May 10 – As word arrives that the Dutch Republic has agreed to return control of Maastricht to France, the French Army's leader of the siege, Count Löwendal, marches through the opened city gates with his troops and accepts its surrender.
- June 1
  - A fire in Moscow kills 482 people and destroys 5,000 buildings.
  - José de Escandón is designated by the Viceroy of New Spain as the first Royal Governor of Nuevo Santander. The area covered by the Viceroyalty's new province is now part of the Mexican state of Tamaulipas, and the part of the U.S. state of Texas south of the Guadalupe River (including San Antonio and Corpus Christi).

=== July–September ===
- July 29 – Royal Navy Admiral Edward Boscawen arrives at the coast of southeastern India with 28 ships, to defend Fort St. David from attacks by armies of French India. Historian Francis Grose later writes that Boscawen had brought the largest fleet "ever seen together in the East Indies", with nine ships of the line, two frigates, a sloop, and two tenders" and 14 ships of the British East India Company. Altogether, Boscawen has 3,580 sailors under his command. He then launches an offensive to destroy the French fort at Pondicherry and drive France from the subcontinent.
- August 26 – The first Lutheran Church body in America is founded at a conference in Philadelphia, organized by German-born evangelist Henry Muhlenberg and attended by pastors of orthodox and pious Lutheran communities. The two groups agree to create a common liturgy to govern public worship.
- August – The Camberwell beauty butterfly is named after specimens found at Camberwell in London.
- September 24 – Shah Rukh becomes ruler of Greater Khorasan.

=== October–December ===
- October 12 – War of Jenkins' Ear – Battle of Havana: a British Caribbean squadron engages a Spanish squadron based near Havana.
- October 18 – War of the Austrian Succession: The Treaty of Aix-la-Chapelle is signed to end the war. Great Britain obtains Madras, in India, from France, in exchange for the fortress of Louisbourg in Canada.
- November 22 – The Electorate of Hanover (now occupied by most of the northwestern German state of Niedersachsen or Lower Saxony) issues a decree banishing all adherents of the Moravian Church.
- December 4 – Austria and Spain sign a second treaty to settle the War of the Austrian Succession, and Austria agrees to remove its troops from Modena and Genoa.

=== Date unknown ===
- Leonhard Euler publishes Introductio in analysin infinitorum, an introduction to pure analytical mathematics, in Berlin.
- Montesquieu publishes De l'esprit des lois.
- Friedrich Gottlieb Klopstock publishes the first three cantos of his epic poem Der Messias in hexameters (anonymously), in Bremer Beiträge (Leipzig).
- Adam Smith begins to deliver public lectures in Edinburgh.
- The Royal Swedish Academy of Sciences makes Eva Ekeblad its first female member.
- Construction of the Sveaborg fortification begins near Helsinki.
- The ruins of Pompeii are rediscovered.
- Louis XV breaks his promise to eliminate the income tax, after the Treaty of Aix-la-Chapelle ends the war. The Parlement of Paris protests, so he reduces the tax to 5%.

== Births ==
- January 19 – Antonio Carnicero, Spanish painter (d. 1814)
- February 2 – Adam Weishaupt, German founder of the Order of the Illuminati (d. 1811)

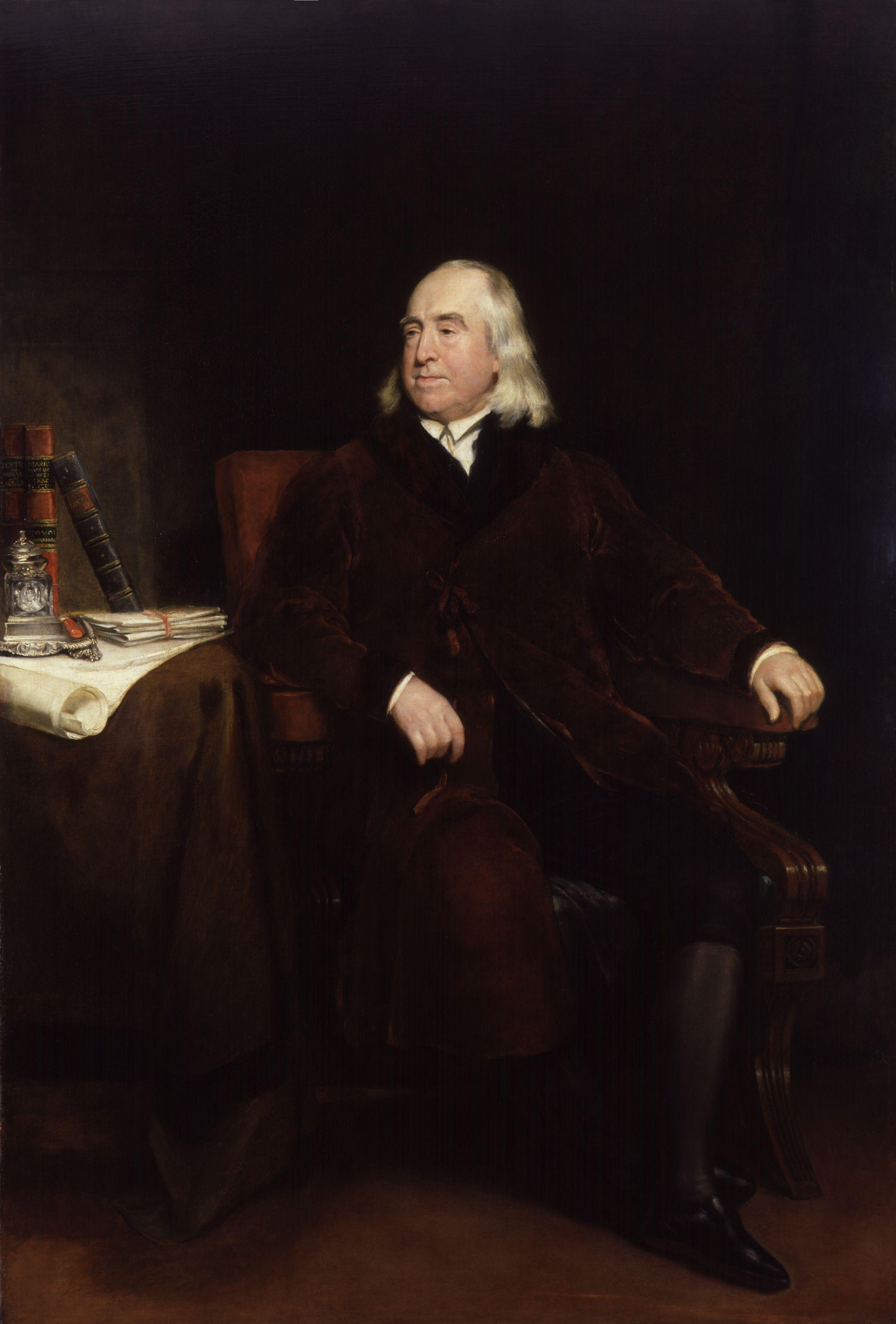
Jeremy Bentham

- February 15 – Jeremy Bentham, English philosopher (d. 1832)
- February 22 – Timothy Dexter, American businessman (d. 1806)
- February 27 – Anders Sparrman, Swedish naturalist (d. 1820)
- March 5
  - William Shield, English violinist, composer (d. 1829)
  - Jonas C. Dryander, Swedish botanist (d. 1810)
- March 8 – William V, Prince of Orange (d. 1806)
- March 10 – John Playfair, Scottish scientist (d. 1819)
- April 12 – Antoine Laurent de Jussieu, French botanist (d. 1836)
- April 13 – Joseph Bramah, English inventor, locksmith (d. 1814)
- April 27
  - Pierre-Louis Ginguené, French author (d. 1816)
  - Adamantios Korais, Greek scholar (d. 1833)
- May 3 – Emmanuel Joseph Sieyès, French cleric, constitutional theorist (d. 1836)
- May 7 – Olympe de Gouges, French playwright (d. 1793)
- May 10 – Louis Pierre Vieillot, French ornithologist (d. 1830)
- May 28 – Frederick Howard, 5th Earl of Carlisle (d. 1825)
- June 30 – Jacques Dominique, comte de Cassini, French astronomer (d. 1845)
- August 8 – Johann Friedrich Gmelin, German naturalist (d. 1804)

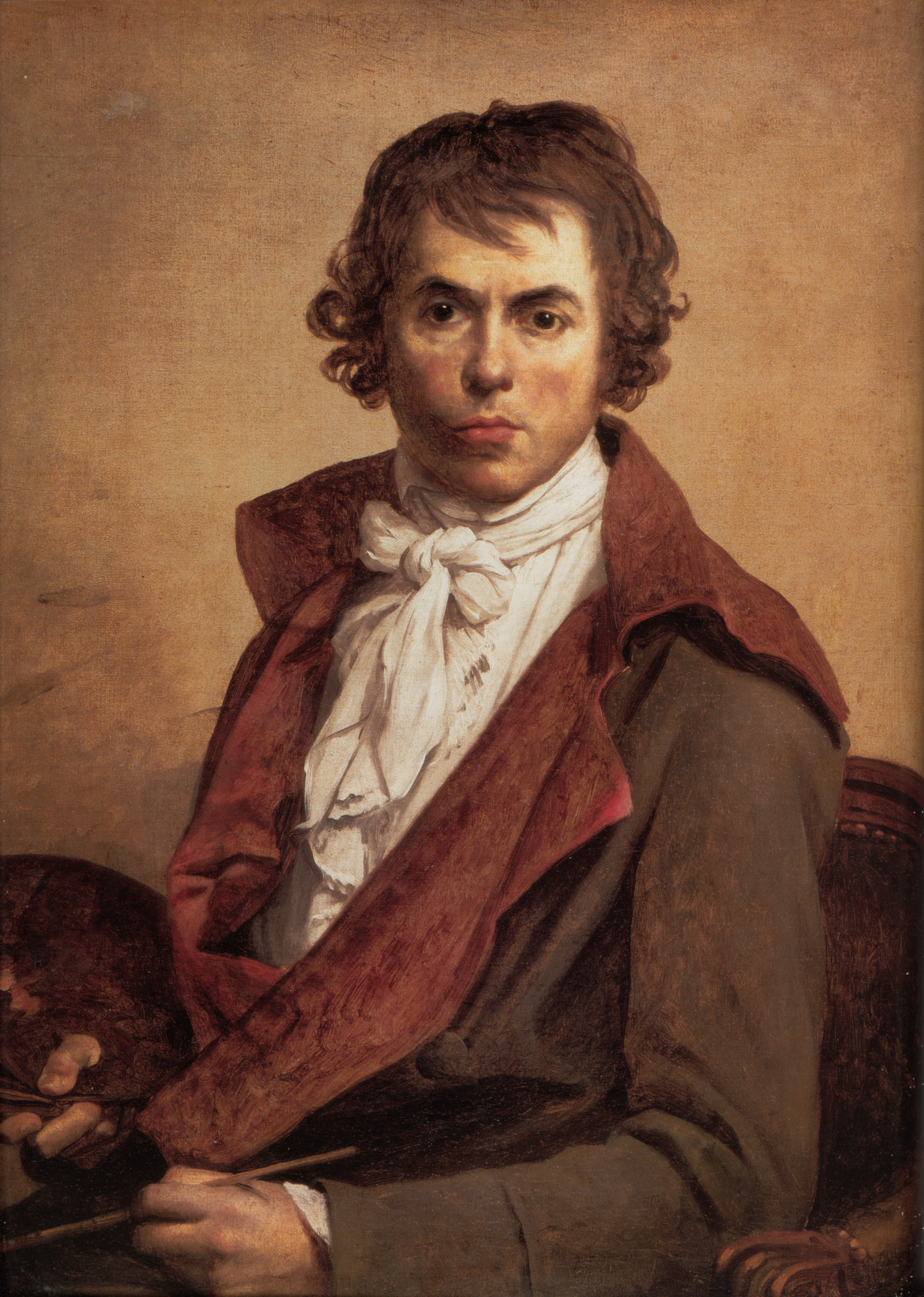
Jacques-Louis David

- August 9 – Bernhard Schott, German music publisher (d. 1809)
- August 30 – Jacques-Louis David, French painter (d. 1825)
- October 7 – King Charles XIII of Sweden (Charles II of Norway) (d. 1818)
- October 13 – Johann Dominicus Fiorillo, German painter, art historian (d. 1821)
- November 11 – King Charles IV of Spain (d. 1819)
- November 13 – William Chalmers, Swedish merchant (d. 1811)
- December 9 – Claude Louis Berthollet, French chemist (d. 1822)
- December 14 – William Cavendish, 5th Duke of Devonshire (d. 1811)
- Date unknown
  - Gioacchino Navarro, Maltese priest and poet (d. 1813)
  - James Sayers, English caricaturist (d. 1823)
  - Timur Shah Durrani, Afghan king (d. 1793)
  - Thomas Holloway, English portrait painter, engraver (d. 1827
  - Stylianos Vlasopoulos, Greek judge, writer (d. 1822)

== Deaths ==
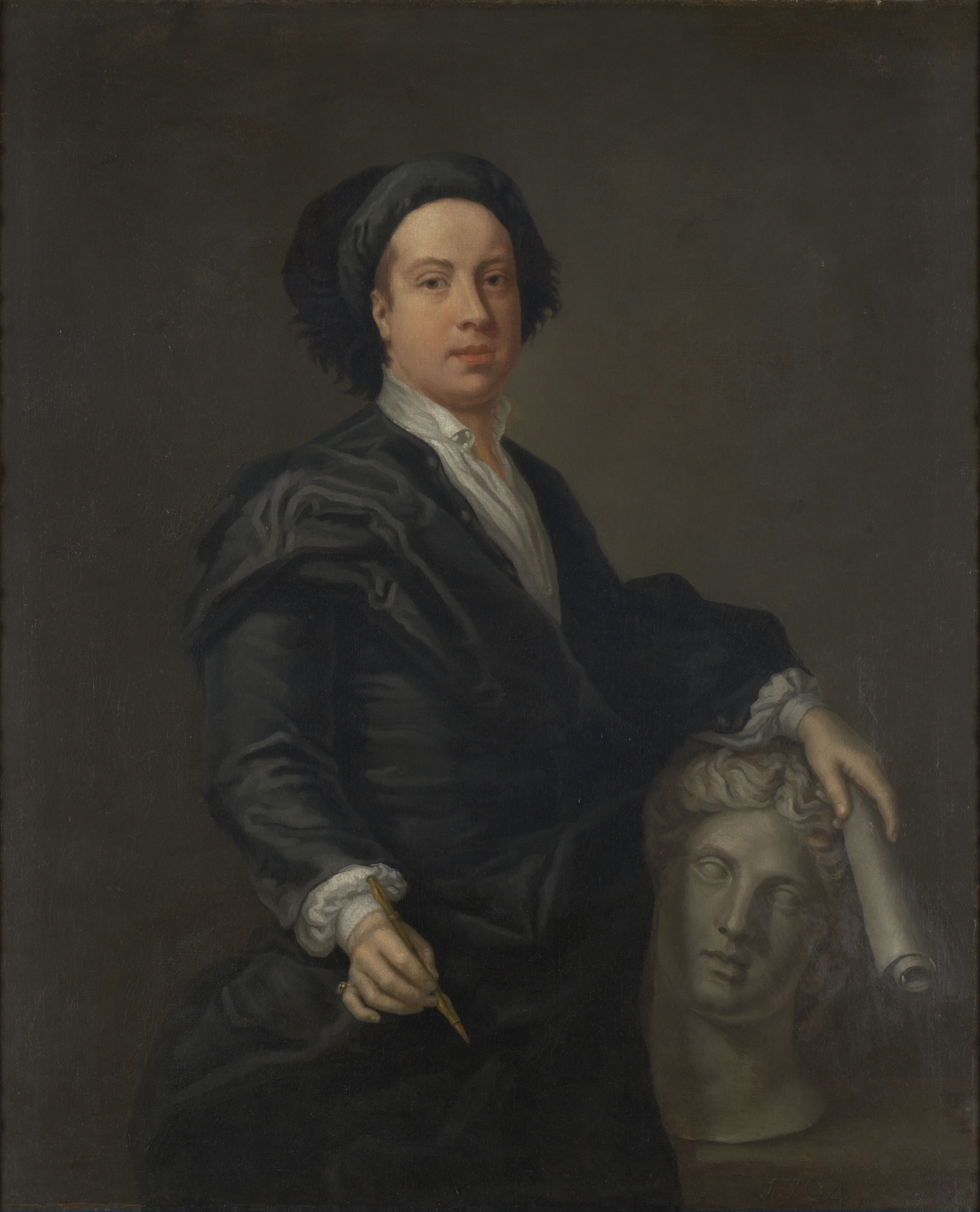
William Kent

- January 1 – Johann Bernoulli, Swiss mathematician (b. 1667)
- January 16 – Arnold Drakenborch, Dutch classical scholar (b. 1684)
- February 18 – Otto Ferdinand von Abensberg und Traun, Austrian field marshal (b. 1677)
- March 7 – Élisabeth Thérèse de Lorraine, French noblewoman, Princess of Epinoy by marriage (b. 1664)
- March 14 – George Wade, British military leader (b. 1673)
- March 23 – Johann Gottfried Walther, German music theorist, organist and composer (b. 1684)
- April 8 – Empress Xiaoxianchun of Qing dynasty (b. 1712)
- April 12 – William Kent, English architect (b. c. 1685)
- April 16 – Muhammad Shah, Mughal emperor of India (b. 1702)
- May 12 – Thomas Lowndes, British astronomer (b. 1692)
- May 17 – Henri, Duke of Elbeuf, member of the House of Lorraine (b. 1661)
- June 16 – Jean Philippe d'Orléans, illegitimate son of future French regent Philippe d'Orleans (b. 1702)
- June 28 – Marretje Arents, Dutch rebel leader (b. 1712)
- August 27 – James Thomson, Scottish poet (b. 1700)
- September 6 – Edmund Gibson, English jurist (b. 1669)
- September 10 – Mother Ignacia del Espíritu Santo, Filipino founder of the Congregation of the Religious of the Virgin Mary (b. 1663)
- September 12 – Anne Bracegirdle, English actress (b. c. 1671)
- September 21 – John Balguy, English philosopher (b. 1686)
- November 25 – Isaac Watts, English hymn writer (b. 1674)
- December 2 – Charles Seymour, 6th Duke of Somerset, English politician (b. 1662)
