= RML 16-inch 80-ton gun =

Ordnance RML 16-inch 80-ton gun
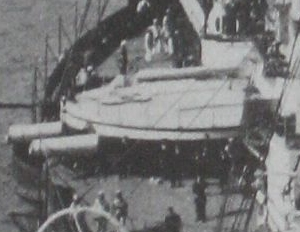
- Port/forward turret on HMS Inflexible
- Type: Naval gun
- Place of origin: United Kingdom

Service history
- In service: 1880–1902
- Used by: Royal Navy
- Wars: Bombardment of Alexandria (1882)

Production history
- Designer: Royal Gun Factory
- Designed: 1874
- Manufacturer: Royal Arsenal
- Unit cost: £10,000
- No. built: 8
- Variants: Mk I

Specifications
- Barrel length: 288 inches (7.3 m) (bore)
- Shell: 1,684 pounds (763.8 kg) Palliser, common, Shrapnel
- Calibre: 16-inch (406.4 mm)
- Muzzle velocity: 1,590 feet per second (480 m/s)
- Maximum firing range: 8,000 yards (7,300 m)

RML 16-inch 80-ton guns were large rifled muzzle-loading guns intended to give the largest British battleships parity with the large guns being mounted by Italian and French ships in the Mediterranean Sea in the 1870s.

== Design and history ==
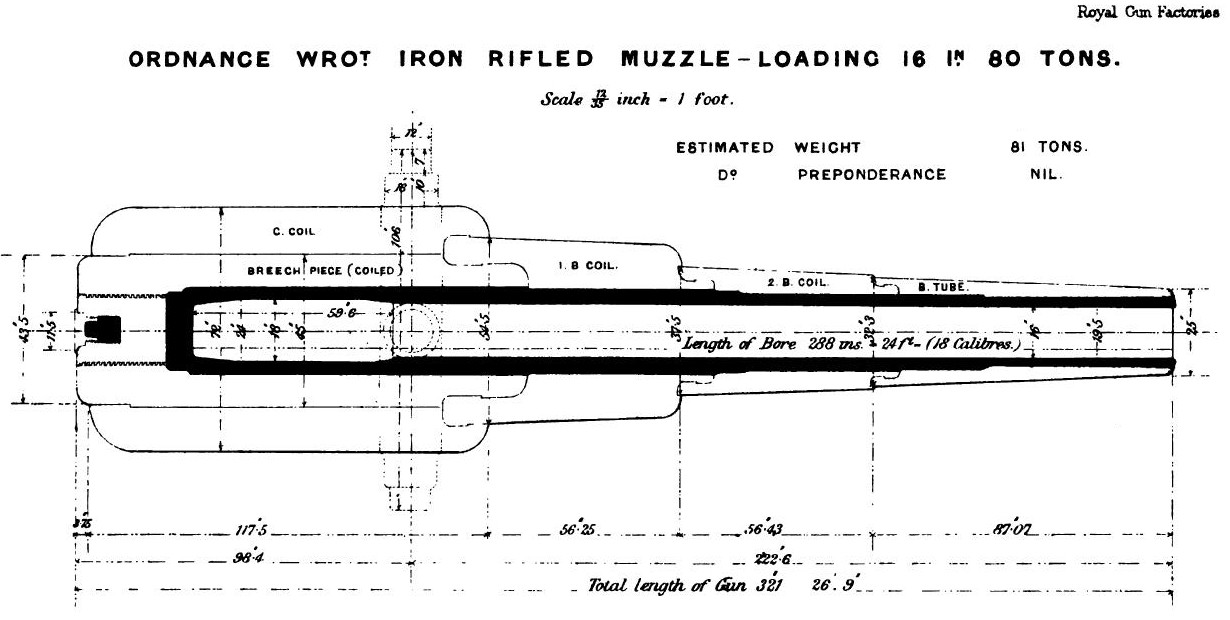
Gun barrel construction

In 1868 trials, the Krupp breechloader 24 cm K L/20 unexpectedly proved itself superior to the British 9-inch muzzle loader. This potentially posed a huge problem for the Royal Navy. The British manufacturers could not produce the huge ingots of quality steel that were required to manufacture comparable guns and relying on imported guns was unacceptable from a strategic perspective. However that might be, the German Navy was very small. Therefore, the British could counter the Krupp guns by simply increasing the size of their less effective muzzle loaders.

In parallel to the contest between muzzleloaders and breechloaders, there was a race between armor and guns. On the Krupp side, this race processed gradually up till the 30.5 cm caliber. It then escalated with Krupp producing the 35.5 cm MRK L/22.5 of 56t and the United Kingdom making the 16-inch 80-ton gun.

After a long design and experimentation period beginning in 1873, HMS Inflexible with its four guns, became the only ship to mount the 16-inch 80-ton gun, in 1880. By that time such muzzle-loading guns were already obsolescent and were being superseded by a new generation of rifled breechloading guns.

Two more guns were mounted for coastal defence in the Admiralty Pier Turret at Dover.

== Characteristics ==
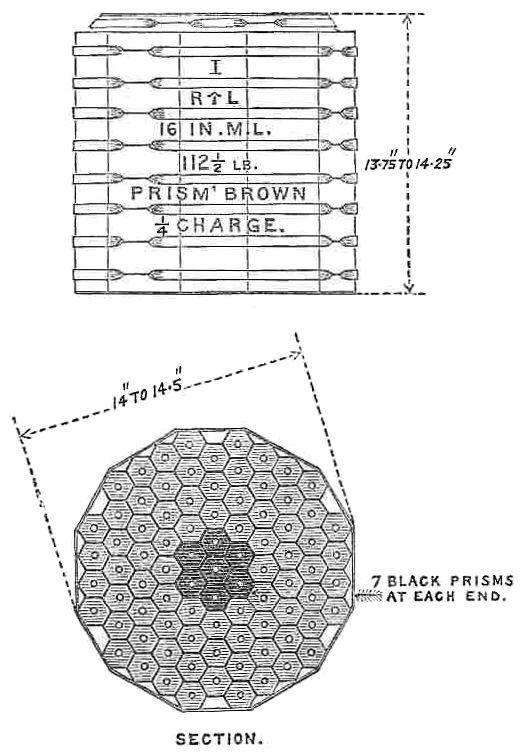
112½-pound ¼ charge brown prism powder cartridge

The gun was constructed of a toughened mild steel inner "A" tube surrounded by multiple wrought-iron coils, breech-piece and a jacket. Rifling was of the "polygroove plain section" type, with 33 grooves increasing from 0 to 1 turn in 50 calibres (i.e. 1 turn in 800 in (2,000 cm)) at the muzzle.

The 16 inch 80 ton was a second-generation RML gun, equipped with polygroove rifling and firing only studless ammunition and using automatic gas-checks for rotation.

The maximum range of the gun was 8,000 yards (7,300 m). This was the maximum practical range at the low elevations used for firing armour-piercing projectiles on a flat trajectory intended to pierce the armoured sides of ships. Longer ranges would have been attained at higher elevations, but the armour-piercing properties would have been diminished at the lower terminal velocity and oblique angle of impact.

The original charge was 450 pounds of prismatic black powder giving a muzzle velocity of 1604 feet/second. However, as this damaged the barrel, it was replaced by brown powder from April 1885. N.J.M. Campbell, "British Super-Heavy Guns". The final velocity was 1590 feet/second firing a 1684-pound projectile, with a charge of 450 pounds Prismatic brown powder (gunpowder).

== Surviving examples ==
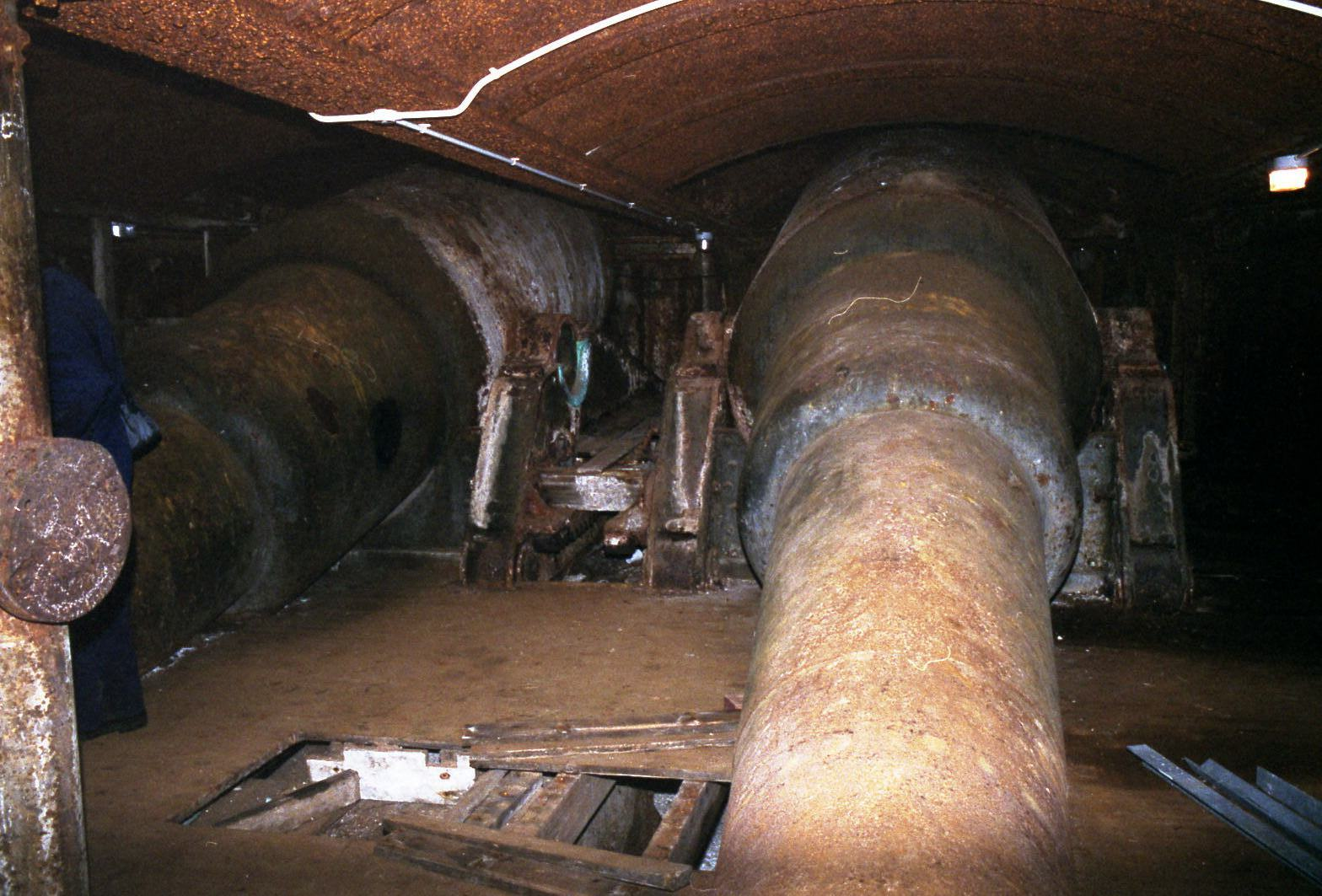
The two guns in the Admiralty Pier Turret as they are today

The only two remaining example are in the ruins of the Admiralty Pier Turret, Dover, Kent, UK.

== See also ==
- List of naval guns

== Bibliography ==
- Brassey, Thomas (1882), The British Navy, vol. II, Longmans, Green and Co., London
- Campbell, N.J.M. (2002), British Super-Heavy Guns, archived from the original on 2011-03-02
- Mackinlay, George (1887), Text Book of Gunnery. 1887, His Majesty's Stationery Office, by Harrison and Sons, St. Martin's Lane
- Text Book of Gunnery. 1902, His Majesty's Stationery Office, by Harrison and Sons, St. Martin's Lane, 1902, archived from the original on 2012-07-12
