= Admiralty Pier Turret =

Armoured turret in Dover, Kent, England

- Dover Harbour in United Kingdom
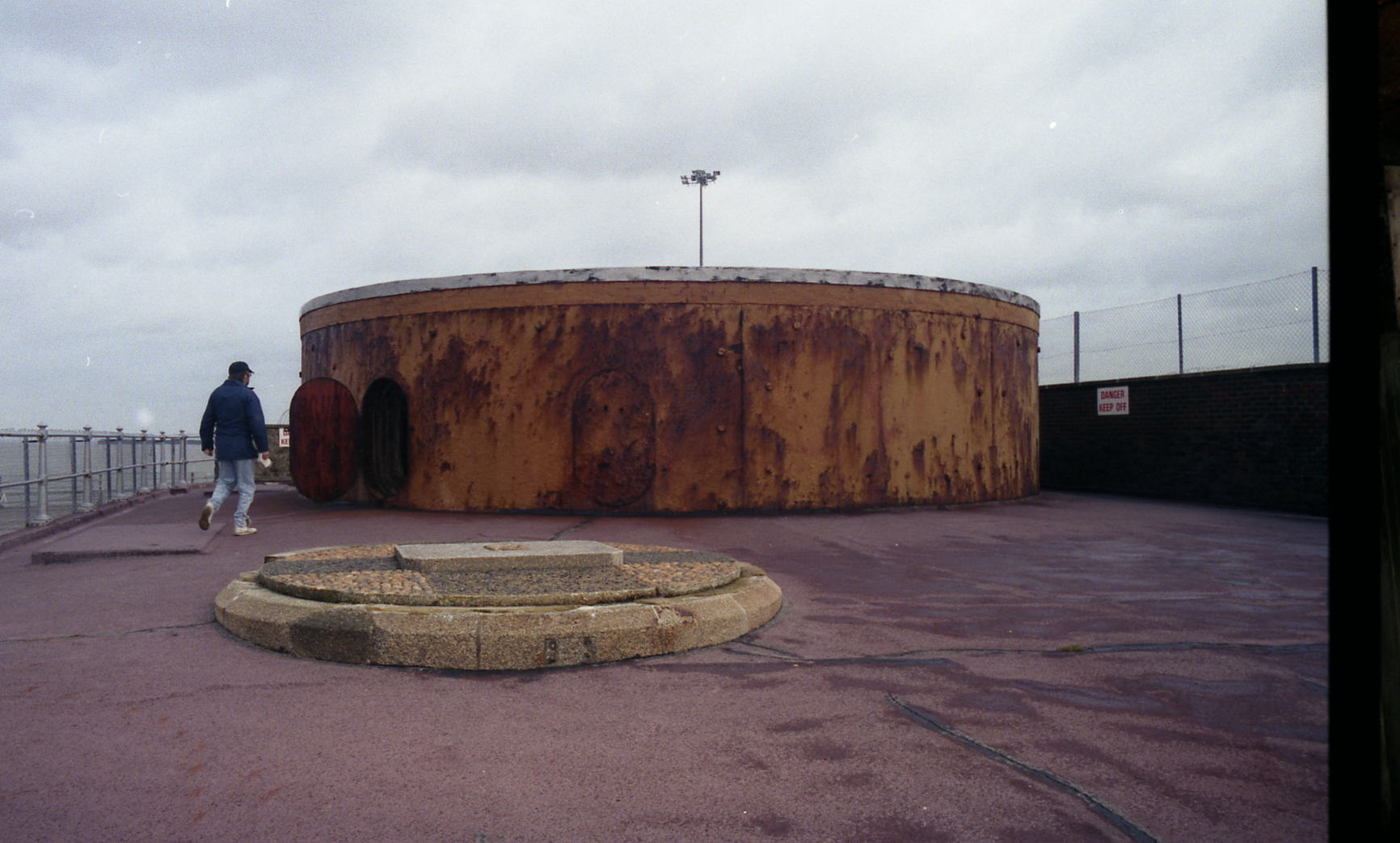
- The Dover Turret Battery which still holds its armament of two 80-ton RML guns

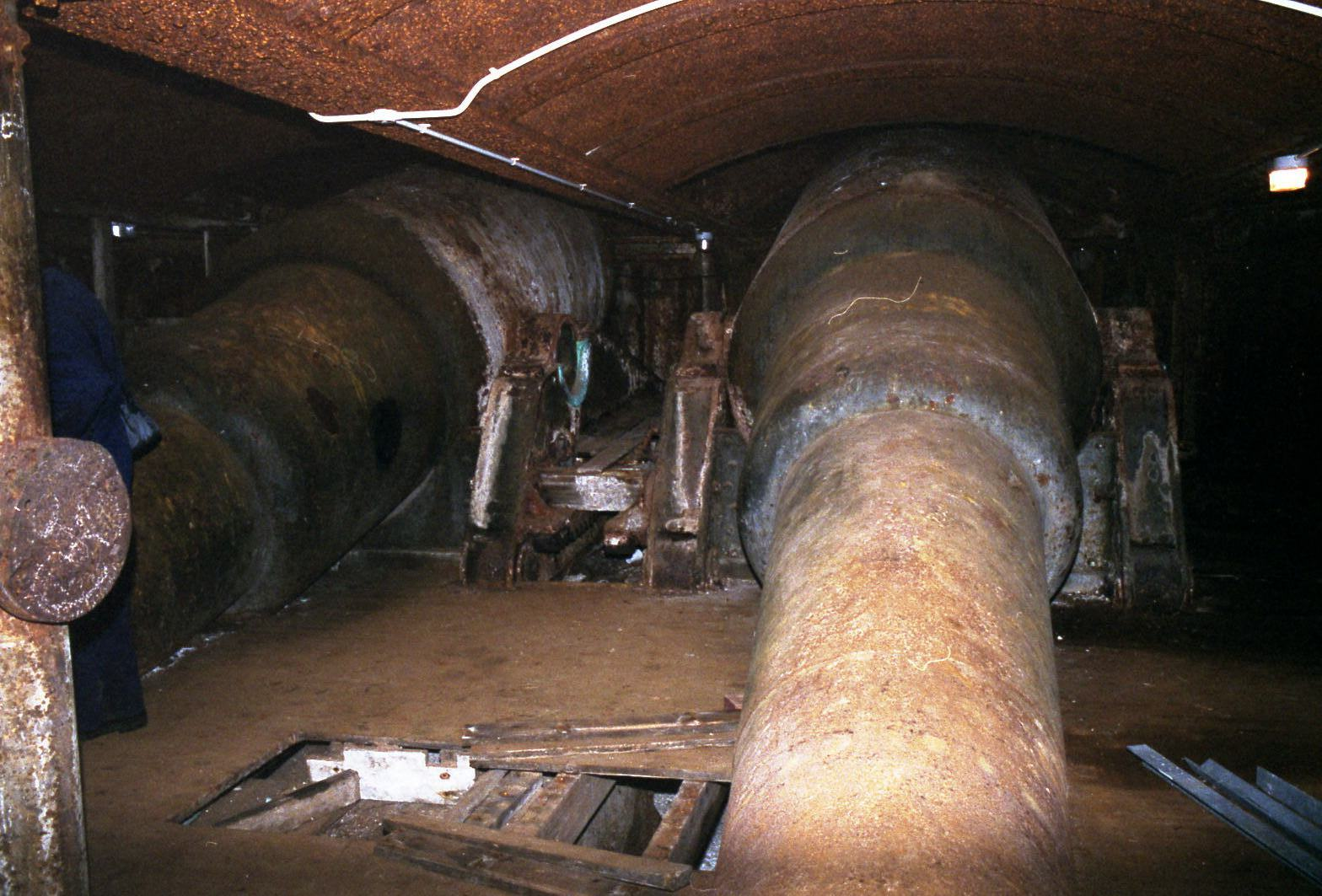
- The two 80-ton RML guns still inside the Dover Turret in 2005

Site information
- Type: Enclosed armoured turret
- Controlled by: Dover Harbour Board
- Open to the public: No

Location
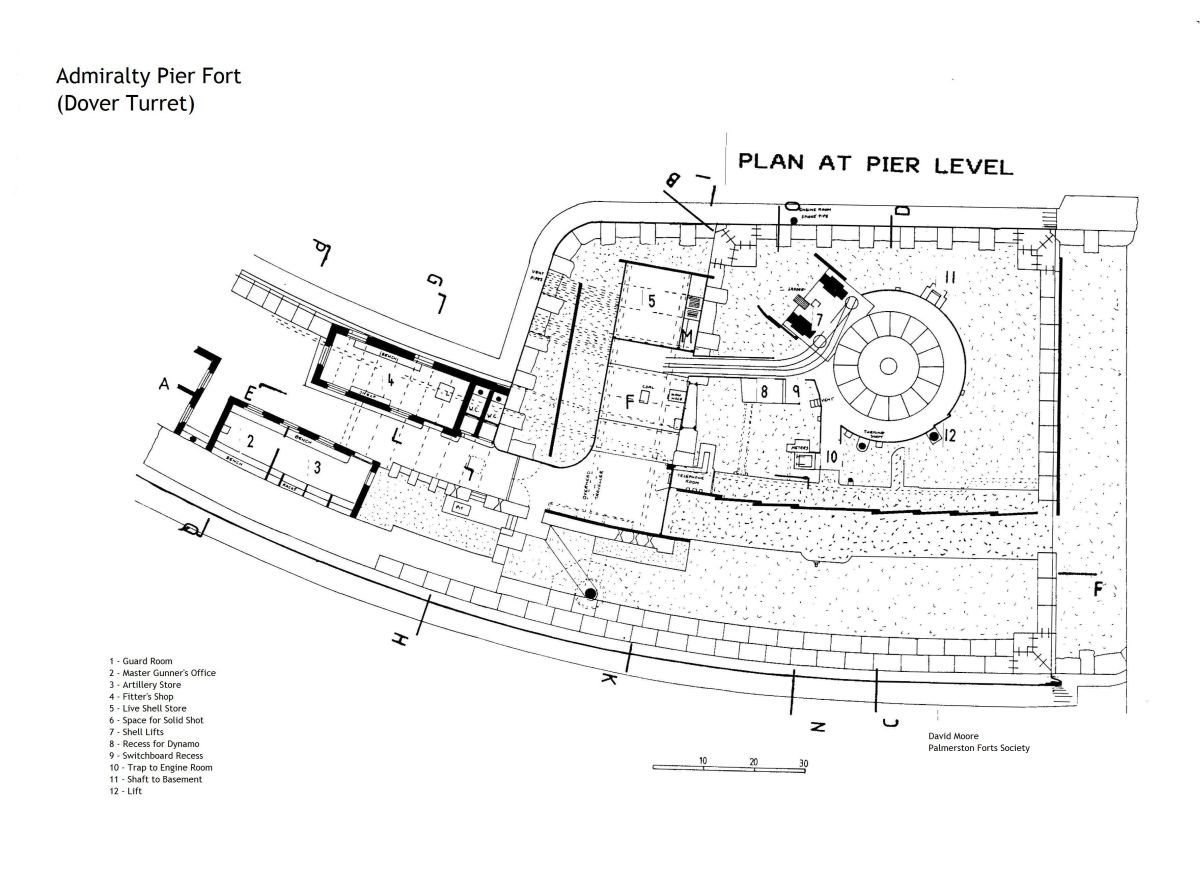
- Plan of Admiralty Pier Fort with Dover Turret
- Plan of Admiralty Pier Fort with Dover Turret
- Coordinates: 51°6′42″N 1°19′8″E

Site history
- Built: 1882
- In use: 1902
- Fate: Obsolete

The Admiralty Pier Turret, or Dover Turret, is an enclosed armoured turret built in 1882 on the western breakwater of Dover Harbour in southeast England. It contains two Fraser RML 16 inch 80 ton guns, the biggest installed in the United Kingdom. Declared obsolete in 1902, it is currently part of the port and inaccessible, though the guns remain in place.

== Admiralty Pier Fort ==
The Admiralty Pier Fort, as distinct from the Dover Turret, was commenced in 1872 as a small fort at the extremity of Dover Pier by adding a further extension and widening the pier. In January 1872 Edward Druce, the engineer in charge, reported that the diving bells had commenced preparing the foundations of the fort and in January 1874 Druce reported that the substructure of the fort had been completed at a cost of £19,718 4s 0d. The armament of the Admiralty Pier Fort was to be two 12-inch muzzle-loading rifled guns of 25 tons as these guns were the most powerful available at the time.

== Dover Turret ==
In 1877 the Defence Committee noted that more powerful guns of 80 tons had been developed and they recommended that a turret be fitted on the Admiralty Pier Fort for two 80-ton guns. The Superintendent of the Royal Gun Factory had been asked for designs for a powerful gun for HMS Inflexible capable of penetrating 20 inches of iron at a range of 1,000 yards and it was these guns that were eventually used as armament for the turret on the Admiralty Pier Fort. The gun took 18 months to build and by September 1875 the first gun was ready. Following test firings at the Royal Arsenal the gun was hauled onto the barge Magog and taken to Shoeburyness.

By 1881 Admiralty Pier Fort was mostly complete and ready to receive its guns. The turret to hold the guns was constructed by the Thames Ironworks and Shipbuilding Company of Blackwall. This turret had a frame of wrought iron clad with three layers of 7-inch armour with 2-inch layers of iron and wood between them. Its weight including the two guns was 895 tons and it revolved on 32 rollers. The Thames Ironworks also built the machinery for the turret. There were four steam engines: The loading engine for loading running back and raising the ammunition, the main engine for rotating the turret, the auxiliary engine to replace either of the first two and the donkey engine which supplied water to the two boilers. In 1881 the Dover Telegraph reported on the proof trials of the turret's No.2 gun. At first it was proposed to move the guns to Dover by rail but this was considered to be too costly as a special carriage would be needed that would be useless for anything else. Eventually it was decided to move the guns by barge and use special sheers and holdfasts as anchors. The guns were lifted by manpower with a capstan instead of by machinery, permission being granted for this by the Board of Trade on condition that it all be removed as soon as possible after the guns were landed. An overhead traveller was constructed to move the guns across to the top of the turret and then lower them onto their carriages. The sheers weighed 100 tons and the traveller weighed 22 tons. They were tested in 1881 and the No.1 gun arrived on 4 December 1881. It was in place by 6 January 1882. The No.2 gun followed on 12 May 1882. The turret machinery was ready for testing at the beginning of 1883 and the testing was arranged for July. The first shot was fired using a 250-pound charge. A second shot followed using a 337-pound charge and finally three shots were fired using a full battering charge of four hundred and fifty pounds of powder. The cliffs did not fall down as predicted, and neither did the fort itself but a couple of panes of glass were broken in the nearby lighthouse. By 1884 more experiments at Dover Turret had taken place with the electric lighting of the turret and the firing gear of the two guns. In 1885 the pier-head had been extended to landward and within this a new shell store, a coal bunker and a new cartridge store were built. In 1886 the committee assembled at the turret to watch the guns being fired. Four rounds were fired and the committee reported that the turret was ready to be handed over to the Royal Artillery.

In 1887 a consultative committee decided that the efficiency of the two 80-ton guns in the Dover Turret was diminished by the exposed position of the magazine. It was proposed to make a new shell store below the water line and to increase the thickness of the foundation of the turret with a mass of concrete. In 1891 the Dover Harbour Board wished to extend the pier-head to the seaward and to give it a more rounded shape due to the rip tide wearing it away. In 1893 the committee reported that the works for strengthening the magazines of Admiralty Pier Fort were nearing completion.

== Pier Turret Battery ==
A report of May 1886 stated that the Admiralty Pier had no defences of its own. Two 6-inch B.L. guns were added on top of Admiralty Pier Fort either side of the turret by April 1909. This was named as 'Pier Turret Battery'. The shell stores beneath the old turret were used to store ammunition for the new battery with shell lifts driven through the roof to each gun. Searchlights were added on the parapet of the pier. By this time the pier had been widened to allow construction of the pier extension. The guns installed in the battery were BL 6-inch Mk VIIs, one from Woolwich and one from South Front Battery. It was handed over to the Royal Artillery on 23 June 1909. A battery command post was added on top of the old lighthouse which was no longer used as a new one had been built at the end of the Admiralty Pier extension.

== The later years ==
Between the two World Wars the Admiralty Pier Fort was transformed into a home for the battery caretaker, who lived there with his wife and family. The guns remained in place inside the turret. In 1920 the Pier Turret Battery was reduced to "care and maintenance" but was used for drill by the Territorial Army. In April 1944 the battery became Home Guard Battery.

According to the fort record book the guns were withdrawn to Woolwich in August 1947. In 1958 all of the battery buildings at Admiralty Pier Fort were demolished and the two BL 6-inch emplacements tidied. One became a shelter and the other a small viewing platform. The fort itself and the turret remained.

After a severe storm in 1987 the walkway along the pier was closed and the turret became inaccessible to the public. Most of the machinery inside the turret has been removed but the guns and their carriages remain together with parts of the shell lifts for the BL 6-inch guns above.

The turret remains under the control of Dover Harbour Board and there are no plans to restore it or open it to view. Originally situated at the end of the western breakwater, the main turret is now part way along, after the breakwater was extended in 1897. It can be viewed from the adjacent Prince of Wales pier for free in daylight hours.

== See also ==
- Tyne Turrets 12-inch guns operational at the mouth of the Tyne 1921–26.

== Bibliography ==
- Carpenter, Austin (1993). Cannon: The Conservation, Reconstruction and Presentation of Historic Artillery. Halsgrove Press. ISBN 1-874448-02-7.
- Brown, David K. (August 2021). Osborne, Richard (ed.). "The Dover Turret, Admiralty Pier Fort". Warships: Marine News Supplement. 75 (8): 416–419. ISSN 0966-6958.
