= Bombardment of Alexandria =

1882 battle of the Anglo-Egyptian War

- Part of the Anglo-Egyptian War
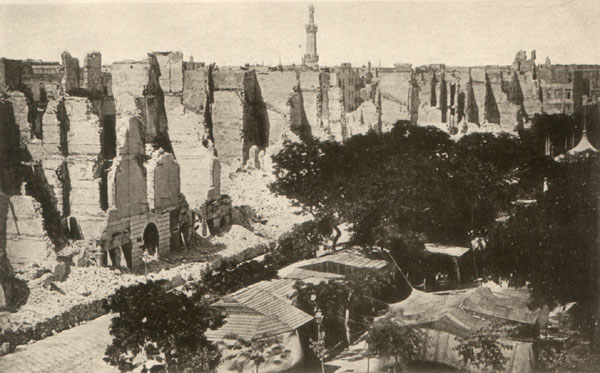
- Alexandria in ruins after the bombardment
Date	11–13 July 1882
Location	Alexandria, Egypt 31°11′59″N 29°52′16″E
Result	British victory

Belligerents
United Kingdom	Egypt

Commanders and leaders
(United Kingdom) Beauchamp Seymour	(Egypt) Ahmed 'Urabi

Strength
British: 9 battleships 1 torpedo boat 1 steamer 5 gunboats	11 forts

Casualties and losses
6 killed 27 wounded	250–350 wounded 600–700 killed
- Unknown number of civilians killed Large sections of Alexandria destroyed in bombardment and subsequent fires

The Bombardment of Alexandria in Egypt by the British Mediterranean Fleet took place on 11–13 July 1882. Admiral Beauchamp Seymour was in command of a fleet of fifteen Royal Navy ironclad ships which had previously sailed to the harbor of Alexandria to support the khedive Tewfik Pasha amid Ahmed 'Urabi's nationalist uprising against his administration and its close ties to British and French financiers. He was joined in the show of force by a French flotilla as well. The move provided some security to the khedive, who withdrew his court to the now-protected port, but strengthened 'Urabi's nationalists within the army and throughout the remainder of Egypt.

On 11 June, anti-European riots began in Alexandria. The city's European residents fled and the Egyptian 'Urabist army began fortifying and arming the harbour. An ultimatum to cease this build-up being refused, the British fleet began a 10½-hour bombardment of the city without French assistance. Alexandria was occupied after the bombardment two days later by British sailors and marines. Forces from Malta then arrived to reinforce British positions including at Ramleh as expeditionary forces sailed from UK and other British garrisons. Historians argue about whether Admiral Seymour exaggerated the threat from the Egyptian batteries at Alexandria in order to force the hand of a reluctant Gladstone administration. Once the British had occupied the city and reinforcements arrive, they then proceeded to a full-scale invasion to restore the authority of the khedive. Egypt remained under British influence until 1952, with the last British troops leaving in 1956.

== Background (1869–1882) ==
Despite its formal integration into the Ottoman Empire during the 19th century, the Khedivate of Egypt had attained a certain degree of autonomy under the rule of Khedive (viceroy) Muhammad Ali. Under his successor, Ismail Pasha, Egypt initiated a substantial modernisation programme, which was primarily financed by European lenders. However, from the 1870s, the country experienced a significant debt crisis, partly attributable to its contribution to the construction costs of the Suez Canal. In order to address this issue, the Egyptian government increased its tax revenues, but by 1875, the country was effectively bankrupt. Consequently, Ismail Pasha was compelled to sell the Egyptian shares in the Suez Canal to Britain, resulting in the appointment of British and French representatives to oversee the Egyptian economy and administration.

The foreign influence resulted in increasing discontent within the Egyptian population and the army. As a result of the influence of the major European powers, Ismail Pasha was forced to abdicate by the Turkish Sultan on 26 June 1879, whereupon his son Tawfiq took office. From 1880 onwards, half of Egypt's state revenue was used to pay off debts. This led to a high tax burden, inadequate pay for civil servants and the dismissal of soldiers and officers. Opposition to the international control of financial and economic policy formed under Ahmed Urabi Pasha, which led to unrest in the country in the autumn of 1881. As a consequence, the new Khedive Tawfiq had to dismiss his Prime Minister Riaz Pasha. In view of a possible seizure of power by Urabi, Great Britain and France feared that their financial interests would be jeopardised. On condition that a new government was formed, both countries were prepared to guarantee Tawfiq's security and retention of power. However, the Sultan rejected the British-French measures in Egypt, even if they were intended to protect the Khedive from total defeat and deposition.

'Urabi organized a militia and marched on Alexandria. Meanwhile, the European powers gathered in Constantinople to discuss reestablishing the power of the Khedive and an Anglo-French fleet was ordered to the port of Alexandria. The Egyptians began reinforcing and upgrading their fortifications and the British House of Commons ordered ships to be temporarily dispatched from the Channel Fleet to Malta under Admiral Seymour's command.

== Prelude ==
On 20 May 1882, the combined Anglo-French fleet, and five gunboats arrived in Alexandria. (Note: The reasons that the British government sent warships to Alexandria is an object of historical debate, with arguments proposed that it was to protect the Suez Canal and prevent anarchy, and other arguments claiming that it was to protect the interests of British investors with assets in Egypt.) The presence of the foreign fleet exacerbated the tensions in Alexandria between the nationalist forces and the large foreign and Christian population. On 11 and 12 June ferocious riots erupted that soon became a massacre. Both the British and French consuls were wounded trying to intervene. Most European fatalities were incurred in the harbour area, where many gathered in hope of rescue. They were disappointed. British naval personnel ashore passed news of trouble to the ships, but the latter carried few marines and did nothing. Around fifty Europeans were killed in the city, and some others outside. More than a hundred Egyptians lost their lives. Some 20,000 Alexandrians of all nationalities fled for safety to the European ships.

The reaction by European countries to the disturbance was swift. By 10 July nearly every non-Egyptian had evacuated Alexandria. Meanwhile, the garrison had continued to fortify the various forts and towers with additional guns until Admiral Seymour issued an ultimatum to 'Urabi's forces to stop fortifying or the British fleet would bombard the city. Four days earlier, the French Admiral Conrad, had informed Seymour that in the event of British bombardment, the French fleet would depart for Port Said and would not participate in the bombardment. The ultimatum, which was ignored amid denials of the defensive works by the Egyptian governor, was set to expire at 7:00 am on 11 July.

== Harbour and fortifications ==
The main harbour of Alexandria was back then characterised by its elongated, narrow, and rectangular configuration, extending in a general northeasterly and southwesterly direction. The harbour's length spaned between five and six nautical miles, with an average width of one and a quarter miles. The fortifications comprised a series of open works that were nearly continuous, with closed works at the principal salients. The city was fortified with approximately 15 such structures.

The sites of the forts were, in the main, selected with good judgment. Fort Silsileh defends the eastern approach, Fort Pharos the eastern and northern, aided in the latter by Fort Ada, the Ras-el-Tin Lines, and the Light-House Fort. The command of this last fort includes the Corvette and Boghaz Passes and the inner harbor. Any vessel attempting the Corvette or the Boghaz Pass would also be exposed to the fire of Fort Saleh Aga, Oom-el-Kabebe, Kumaria, the Mex Lines, and Fort Mex, while Fort Marsa el-Khanat and Marabout were admirably placed to protect the Marabout Pass. The forts Saleh Aga, Oom-el-Kabebe, and Kumaria were furthermore intended to aid in the defense of the narrow neck of land lying between the Mediterranean on the north, or, strictly speaking, Alexandria Harbor, and Lake Maroeotis on the south.

The land about Alexandria being extremely low, none of these works have any considerable elevation above the sea. They are of old design and construction in every case, (except Adjemi), and they derive their value chiefly from Armstrong muzzle-loading rifles with which the principal among them are armed. To adapt the old fortifications to the new guns, the parapets were sometimes heightened and thickened, embrasures cut, and traverses built.The Egyptians had just over 140 cannons with a calibre of 6.5 to 16 inches.

== The fleet ==
Admiral Seymour had at his disposal eight iron-clads and five wooden gun-boats. Of the former five attacked the outer line of defenses, while the remaining three operated inside. The gun-boats were variously employed, their most serious effort being directed against Fort Marabout. The outer squadron was composed of the Alexandra, Inflexible, Sultan, Superb, and Temeraire, and was under the command of Captain Walter J. Hunt-Grubbe. The inshore squadron of armored ships, consisted of the Invincible (flagship), the Monarch, and the Penelope. The ships had at least 89 guns with a calibre of 6 to 12 inches. Although most of them were muzzleloading some were breechloading.

=== Battleships ===
- HMS Alexandra
- HMS Superb
- HMS Sultan
- HMS Temeraire
- HMS Inflexible
- HMS Monarch
- HMS Invincible
- HMS Penelope

=== Torpedo boat ===
- HMS Hecla

=== Despatch boat ===
- HMS Helicon

=== Gunvessels ===
- HMS Bittern
- HMS Beacon
- HMS Condor
- HMS Cygnet
- HMS Decoy

== Battle ==
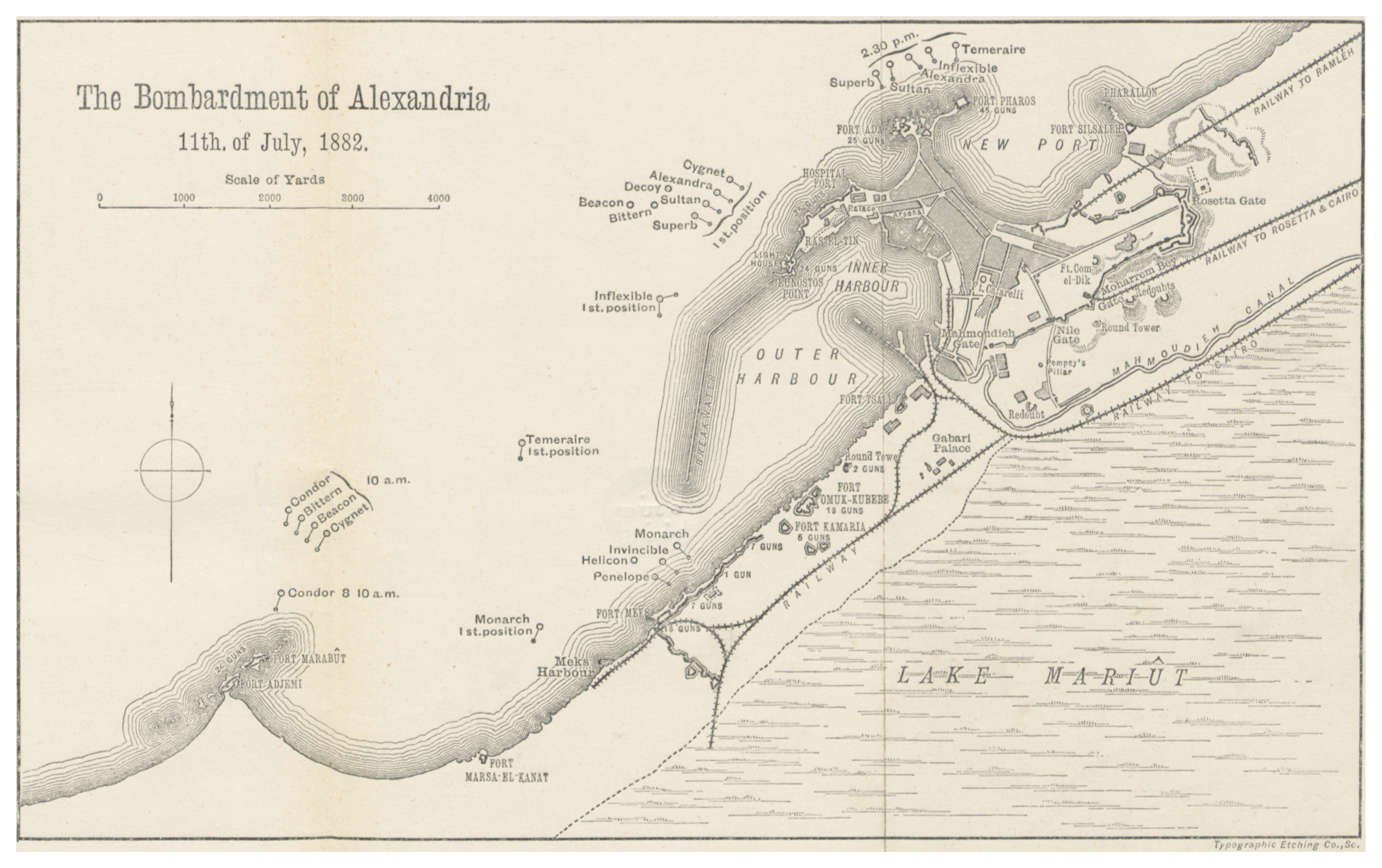
Plan of the Bombardment showing the locations of British ships during 11 July.

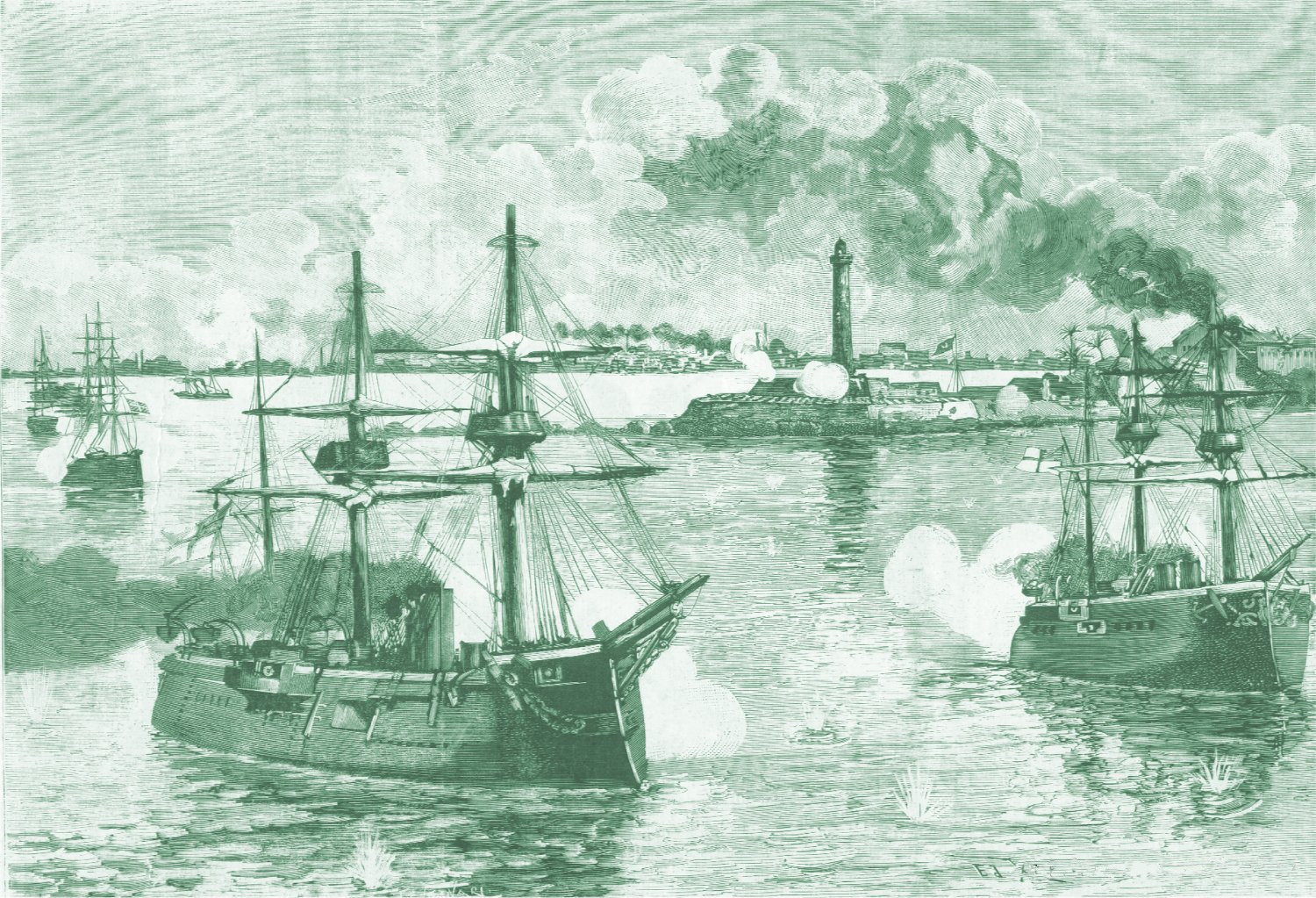
British ships shelling Alexandria by a French artist.

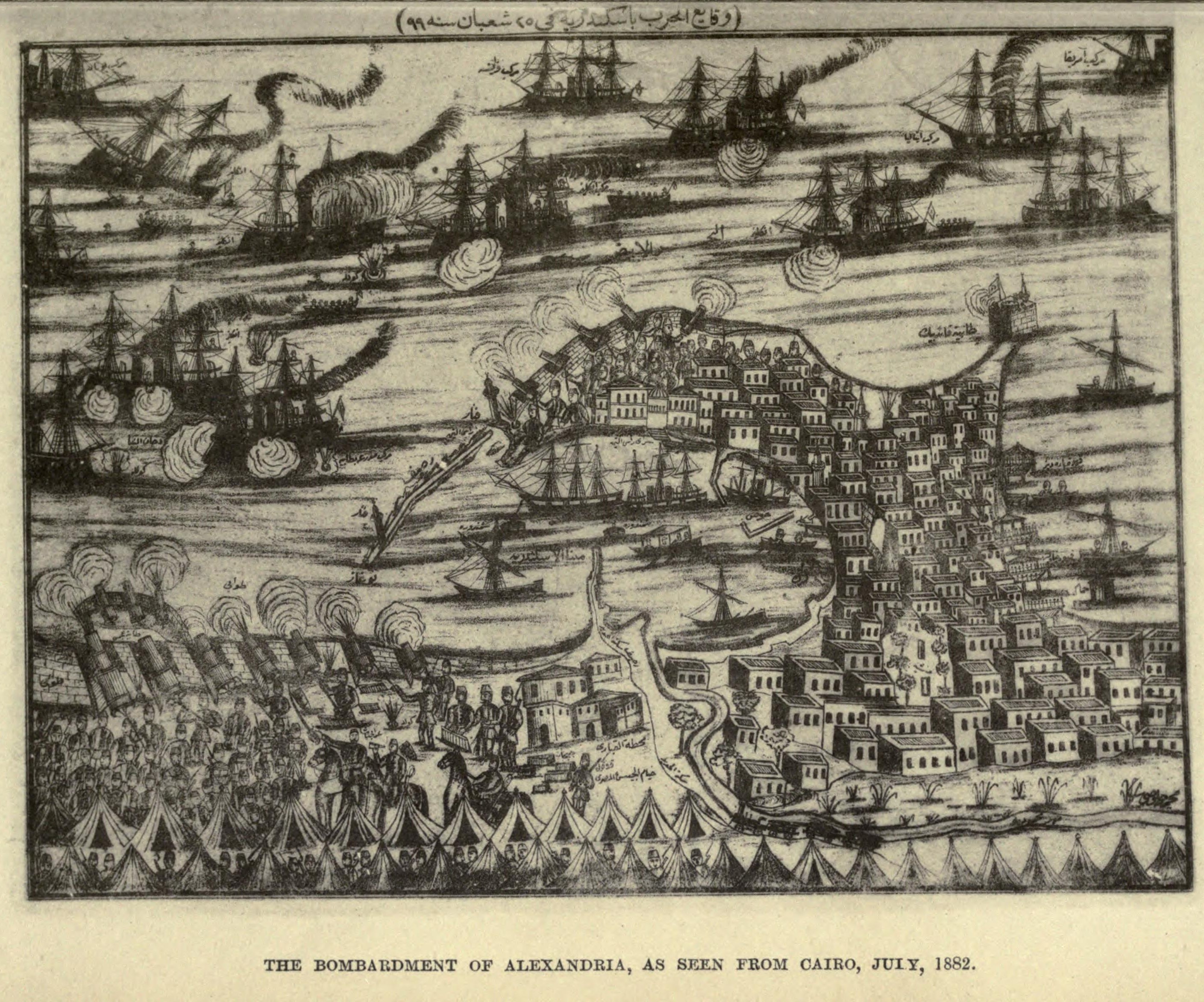
A view of the bombardment by an artist in Cairo.

During the night of July 10 and 11 the vessels of the British fleet took up the positions to which they had been severally assigned. At daybreak of the 11th the nature of the attack became evident. The heavier ships were placed to engage the northern line and the lighter ships the inner line. The Alexandra, Sultan, and Superb maneuvered under way at the outset, firing at the Light-House Fort and Ras-el-Tin Lines. The Inflexible was at anchor, directing the fire of one turret against the Light-House Fort, that of the other against Oom-el-Kabebe. The Temeraire was aground during the early part of the day, firing at Mex. The Invincible, Monarch, and Penelope were under way out of the line of the Temeraire's fire, engaging Mex and Marsa-el-Khanat.

At 7 a. m. on the 11th Seymour signaled his fleet to open fire. A steady fire was maintained on all sides until 10.30 a. m., when the Sultan, Superb, and Alexandra, which had been hitherto under way, anchored off the Light-House Fort, and by their well-directed fire, assisted by that of the Inflexible, which weighed and joined them at 12.30 p. m., succeeded in silencing most of the guns in the forts on Ras-el-Tin; still some heavy guns in Fort Ada kept up a desultory fire. About 1.30 p. m. a shell from the Superb, whose practice in the afternoon was very good, blew up the magazine and caused the retreat of the remaining garrison. These ships then directed their attention to Fort Pharos, which was silenced with the assistance of the Temeraire, which joined them at 2.30 p. m., when a shot from the Inflexible dismounted one of the heavy guns. The Hospital Battery was well fought throughout, and, although silenced for a time by a shell from the Inflexible, it was not until 5 p. m, that the artillerymen were compelled to retire from their guns by the fire of the offhore squadron and the Inflexible. The Invincible, supported by the Penelope, and assisted by the Monarch, under way inside the reefs, as well as by the Inflexible and Temeraire in the Boghaz and Corvette Channels, succeeded, after an engagement of some hours, in silencing and partially destroying the batteries and lines of Mex. Fort Marsa-el-Khanat was destroyed by the explosion of the magazine after half an hour's action with the Monarch. About 2 p. m. the gunners of the western lower battery of Mex had abandoned their guns, and the supports had retired to the citadel. Soon afterwards the gun-vessels and gun-boats were called in and under cover of their fire landed a party of twelve volunteers, destroying several guns, and returned without a casualty. Previous to this, after the action had become general, Commander Lord Charles Beresford, of the Condor, stationed as repeating ship, seeing the accuracy with which two 10-inch rifled guns in Fort Marabout were playing upon the ships engaged off Fort Mex, steamed up to within range of his 7-inch 90-cwt. gun, and soon drew off the fire. The Condor was then ordered to be supported by the Beacon, Bittern, Cygnet, and Decoy, the Cygnet having been engaged with the Ras-el-Tin forts during the early part of the day. The action generally terminated successfully at 5.30 p. m., when the ships anchored for the night.

On the morning of 12 July, the wind rose and a long heavy swell got up, causing the iron-clads rolling heavily at their anchorage. At eight o'clock the admiral summoned the captains of the ships of war on board the Invincible, and it was agreed to postpone the bombardment, as, with the vessels rolling so heavily, accuracy of aim would be impossible, and the shots might fly high and damage the town, which it was particularly desired to avoid. Soon afterwards Temeraire reconnoitred the forts and discovered that the Hospital battery had reconstituted its defences. At 10:30 a.m., Temeraire and Inflexible opened fire, and the battery raised the flag of truce at 10:48 a.m. Very soon an Egyptian boat set out to the flagship bearing the flag of truce, and a cease-fire was ordered. By 2:50 p.m., Bittern signaled that the negotiations had failed and the bombardment was to resume. Still, most of the forts flew white flags and an irregular cannonade by the British fleet began. By 4:00 p.m. a fire had broken out on shore, and by evening the fire had engulfed the wealthiest quarter of Alexandria, the area predominantly inhabited by Europeans. The fire raged for the next two days before it burned itself out. Admiral Seymour, unsure of the situation in the city, didn't land any troops to take control of the city or fight the fire. It was not until 14 July that British marines and sailors landed in Alexandria.

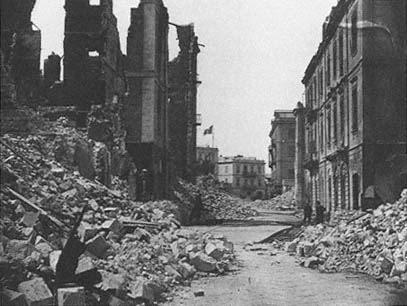
Photo in Alexandria after the bombardment and fire of 11–13 July 1882.

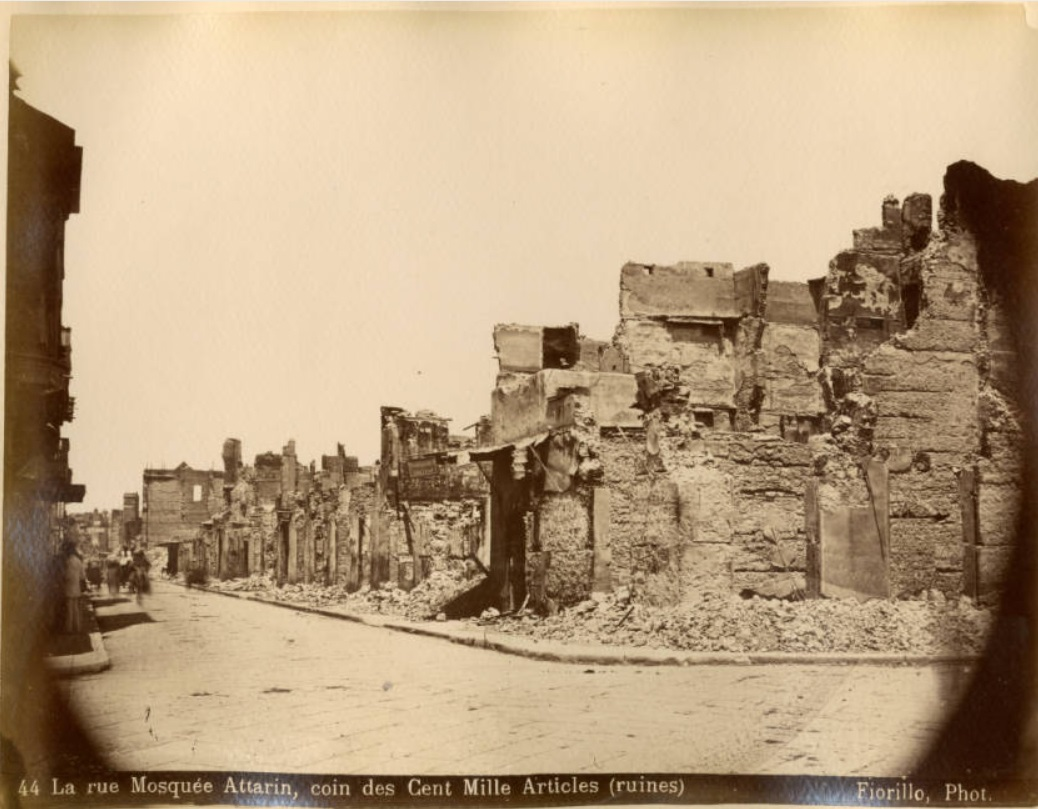
Attarine Mosque Street after bombardment

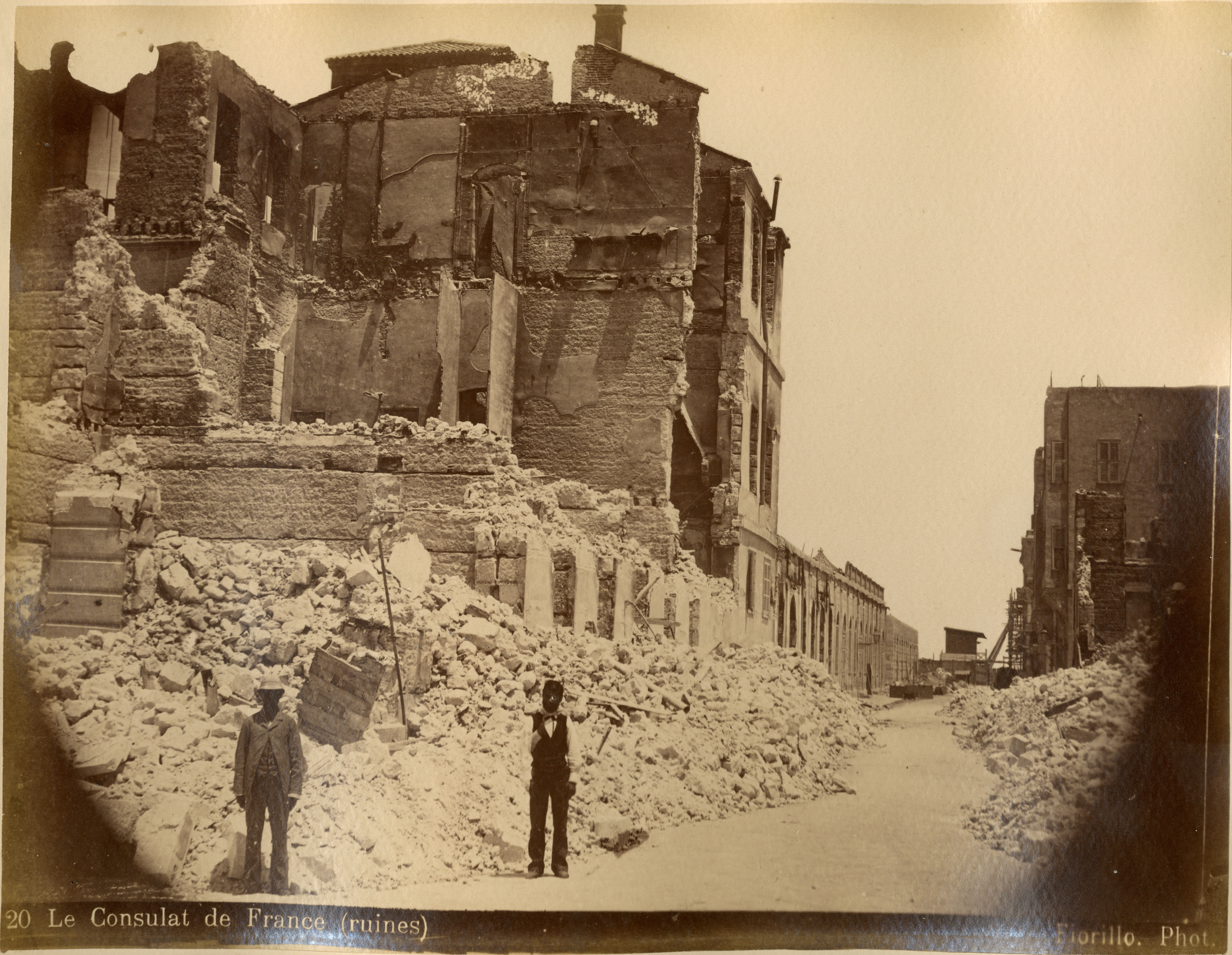
Alexandria after the bombardment of 1882, French consulate, in ruins

== Aftermath ==
It has been estimated that as many as 30 percent of the shells fired by the Royal Navy missed their targets and landed in the city itself, causing death and injury among the inhabitants, damaging or destroying many buildings, and starting fires which spread over the following days. This damage was exacerbated by panic, looting and arson, while many buildings rendered unsafe by the bombardment were subsequently demolished by the British during their occupation.

British sailors and marines landed and attempted to take control of the blackened ruins of the city and prevent the looting, while propping up the Khedive's shaky government. Eventually order was restored, and a month later General Garnet Wolseley landed a large force of British troops in Alexandria as a staging location for attacking 'Urabi near the Suez Canal at the Battle of Tell El Kebir.

Photographer Luigi Fiorillo created an album of fifty pages showing the changes in Alexandria from start to finish of this attack. These photos can now be found online at The American University of Cairo in the Rare Books and Special Collections Digital Library. This digital library was established in the fall of 2011 and the photographs of the Bombardment of Alexandria were compiled between June and August 2012.

The bombardment was described in disparaging terms by British MP Henry Richard:

I find a man prowling about my house with obviously felonious purposes. I hasten to get locks and bars, and to barricade my windows. He says that is an insult and threat to him, and he batters down my doors, and declares that he does so only as an act of strict self-defence.

After that the Urabi revolt was put down. Egypt came under partial British military occupation and significant governmental supervision (including as an outright British Protectorate from 1914–22) and remained under British domination through the Second World War.

== See also ==
- List of conflicts in the Near East

== Bibliography ==
- Brook, Peter; Beasecker, Robert; Lee, Anthony J. & Millar, Steve (2001). "Question 39/00: British Bombardment of Alexandria". Warship International. XXXVIII (4): 331–332. ISSN 0043-0374.
- Gibbs, Jay (2003). "Question 39/00: British Bombardment of Alexandria". Warship International. XL (4): 304–305. ISSN 0043-0374.
- Goodrich, Caspar F. (1885). Report of the British naval and military operations in Egypt, 1882. Washington D.C.: U.S. Government Printing Office. OCLC 301706525. This article incorporates text from this source, which is in the public domain.
- Archer, Thomas (1885). The war in Egypt and the Soudan. An episode in the history of the British Empire, being a descriptive account of the scenes and events of that great drama, and sketches of the principal actors in it. London: Blackie & Son. OCLC 5628196. This article incorporates text from this source, which is in the public domain.
- Holland, Robert (2013). Blue-water empire: the British in the Mediterranean since 1800. London: Penguin. ISBN 9780141036106.
- Royle, Charles (1900). The Egyptian Campaigns (1882–1885). London: Hurst and Blackett, Ltd.
- Fahmy, Khaled; MacDonald Reid, Donald (1998). Modern Egypt from 1517 to the end of the twentieth century. The Cambridge History of Egypt. Vol. II. Cambridge: Cambridge University Press. ISBN 0521471370.
- Wright, William (2009). A Tidy Little War: The British Invasion of Egypt, 1882. Spellmount. ISBN 9780752450902.
