= Luigi Fiorillo =

Italian photographer (1847–1898)

- Born: 1847; Naples, Kingdom of the Two Sicilies
- Died: 1898 (aged 50–51)
- Occupation: Photographer
- Years active: especially from 1870 to his death
- Known for: early photography from Egypt, Algeria, Palestine, and Eritrea

Luigi Fiorillo (1847–1898) was an Italian photographer, active in the Middle East and parts of Africa.

== Life and career ==
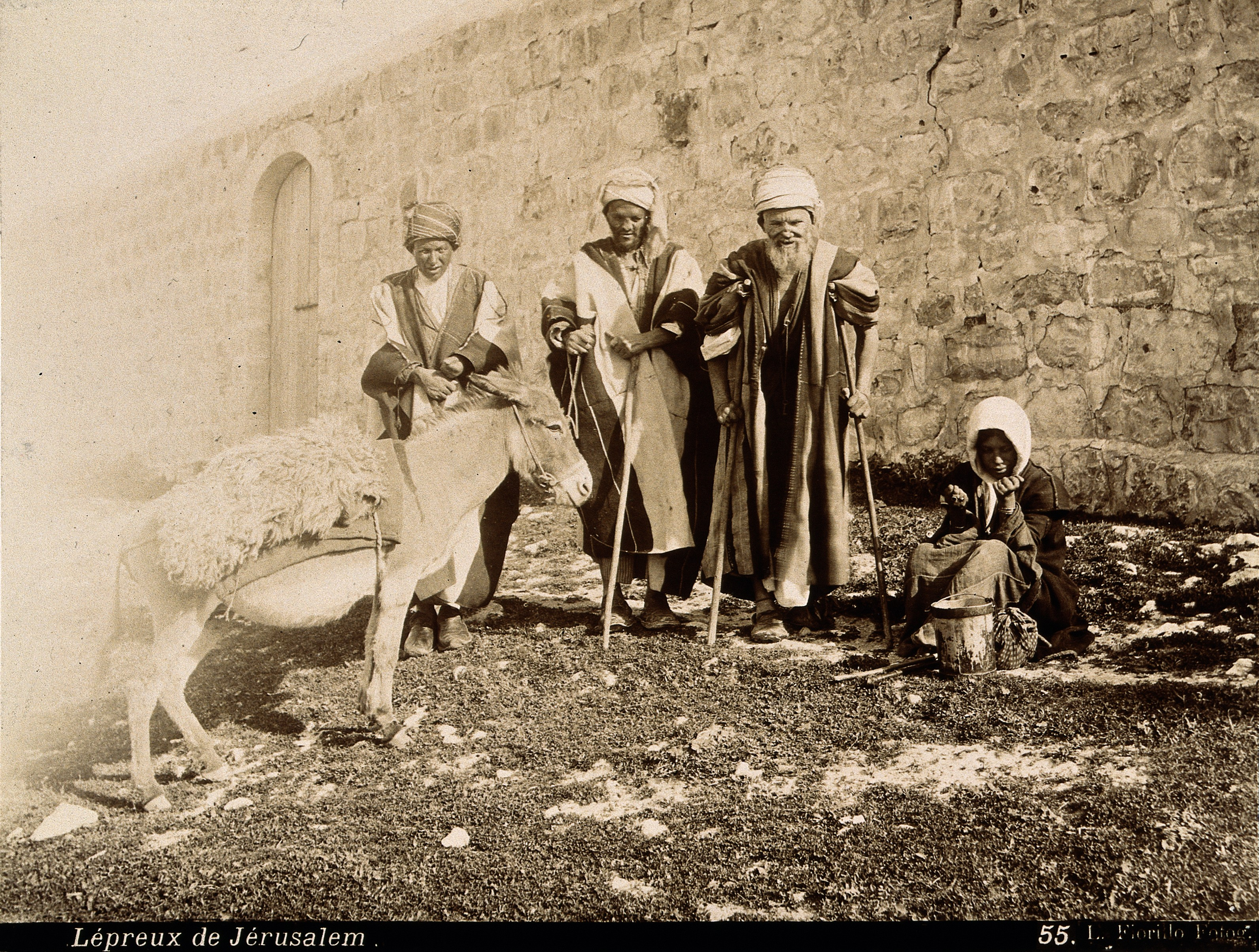
A group of lepers in Jerusalem.

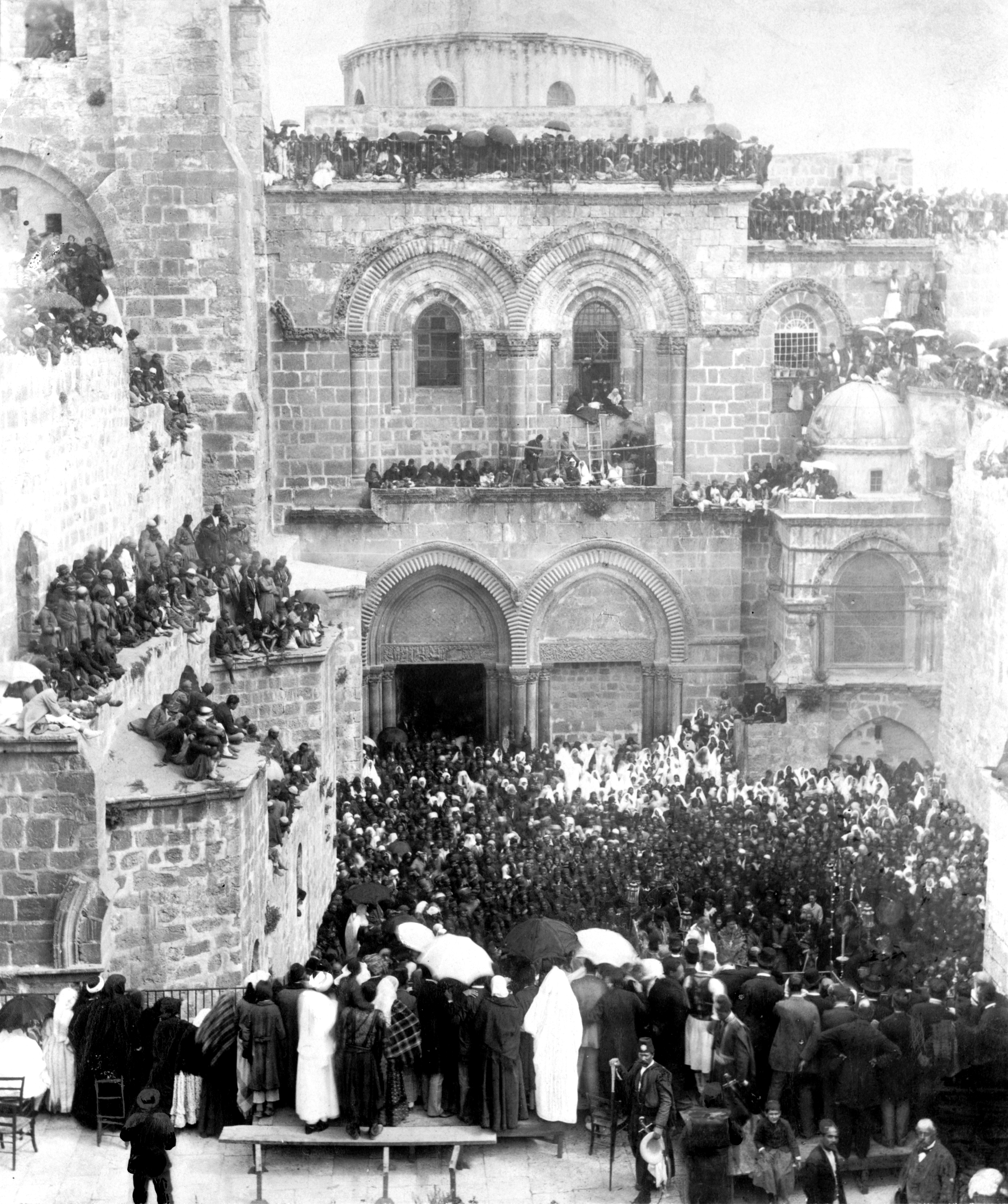
Church of the Holy Sepulcher, foot washing ceremony on Maundy Thursday, circa 1880.

Much is yet unknown about Luigi Fiorillo's private life, including his birth date and place. It is documented that he was active in North Africa starting from 1870, worked in Egypt (where he opened a studio in Alexandria), Algeria, Palestine and then in Eritrea.

In 1871 he exhibited in Naples and in 1878 he participated in the third Paris World's Fair, where he obtained an honourable mention. He received further awards at international exhibitions in Ottawa (1879 [?]) and Boston (1884).

In 1877 he took part in an expedition of the Italian Geographical Society to East Africa.

Starting from the 1880s he was given the title of "photographe de Son Altesse le Prince Mohammed Toussoun Pasha", "photographer to His Highness, Prince Mohammed Toussoun Pasha", son of Sa'id, the Wāli of Egypt and Sudan.

In 1881 he made a report on the revolt of the Egyptian army led by Ahmed ʻUrabi, while the following year he photographed the effects of the British naval Bombardment of Alexandria, which took place on 11 July during the Anglo-Egyptian War of 1882.

Between 1887 and 1888 he joined an expedition organised by lieutenant-general it:Alessandro Asinari di San Marzano, town commander of Massaua, to regain Italian positions lost to Ethiopia in Eritrea following the 1887 Battle of Dogali. In Eritrea he was in the retinue of the artillery captain Carlo Michelini. Also in the "firstborn colony", as Italian Eritrea was sometimes called, Fiorillo, it:Edoardo Martinori and Francesco Nicotra together took 142 photographs documenting the Italian activity in the colony.

In 1890 Fiorillo entered into partnership with A. Marques, changing the name of his studio to "Marques & Fiorillo photographers & editors, Assuan".

== The studio after his death ==
After Luigi Fiorillo's death in 1898, the studio continued its activity until the 1920s thanks to his sons and widow. His son Federico later moved to Rhodes, at the time held by Italy (1912–1943), where he first opened a photographic studio in Rhodes and then also one in Leros. At the defeat of Italy in the Second World War, Rhodes became part of Greece and in 1947 Federico Fiorillo was forced to flee with his children to Bari in Italy.

== Legacy ==
In the winter of 2014, an exhibition dedicated to Luigi Fiorillo was housed by the Palazzo Rosso museum in Genoa.
