= Nikolaos Vlasopoulos =

Greek footballer

Nikos Vlasopoulos
Personal information
- Full name: Nikolaos Vlasopoulos
- Date of birth: 30 May 1988 (age 38)
- Place of birth: Serres, Greece
- Height: 1.78 m (5 ft 10 in)
- Position: Midfielder

Youth career
- –2005: Thyella Patras

Senior career*
Years	Team	Apps	(Gls)
2005–2008	Thyella Patras	69	(3)
2008–2010	AEL	5	(0)
2010	Panserraikos	0	(0)
2011–2012	Panachaiki	0	(0)
2013	Thrasyvoulos		
2013–2014	Doxa Drama		
2015	Fostiras		
2015–2021	Anagennisi Deryneia		
2021–2022	Diagoras Vrachnaiika		
2022–2023	A.P.S. Patrai		
- * Club domestic league appearances and goals as of 21 October 2009

Nikolaos "Nikos" Vlasopoulos (Greek: Νικόλαος "Νίκος" Βλασόπουλος; born 30 May 1988) is a Greek football midfielder.

== Career ==
He played for Thyella first team for 3 seasons, from 2005–2006 to 2007–2008, and as of 13 June 2008 he was a AEL player with a 5-year contract. He was released on a free in July 2010 and on 31 August 2010 he signed a contract with Panserraikos On 21 December 2010 Panachaiki announced that Vlasopoulos signed a four-year contract with the club.
