= Stylianos Vlasopoulos =

Stylianos Vlasopoulos (Ital. Signore-Conte Stelio Vlassopulo) (1748–1822) was a scion of the aristocratic Vlassopoulos dynasty of Corfu, which was registered in 1642 in the Golden Book of the nobility (Libro d'Oro). Stylianos was the son of Don Timotheos Vlasopoulos and Countess Miloulias Bulgari of Corfu.

Vlasopoulos studied in Corfu where he was born. He studied law in Italy and was named doctor at the University of Padua. He was judge of the Supreme Court, member of the judicial club of Corfu, lawyer, a member of the Ionian Academy and politician of the Ionian Islands in key positions in the offices of Senator, legislator, mayor of Corfu and Governor of Lefkada.

During Vlassopoulos's tenure in Lefkada, Ali Pasha sent him an ultimatum to give him the armatolous, who were persecuted by Ali. They fled to Lefkada with their families. Vlasopoulos deliberately raised various obstructions, so Ali ordered cannon and troops to Arta, Preveza and Vonitsa and on land across from the island in order to invade it. Vlasopoulos succeeded through his diplomatic skills to save the Greek people of Lefkada from slaughter.

In his later years, he served as advisor to the government of the Ionian Islands. In Corfu, he worked as a judge and a lawyer while he devoted himself to writing. He published works in Italian using the pseudonym Biagio Colonna (who according to at least one author, Michael Pratt, was Vlassopoulos himself), including La Difesa della Chiesa Greca (The Defense of the Greek Church), written in 1800 and placed on the Index Librorum Prohibitorum in 1803. For one period, he was editor of Corfiot publications Mercurio Litterario (1805–1808) and Gazetta Urbana (1802–1803).

== Sources ==
- anemi.lib.uoc.gr
- Greek encyclopedia Nea Domi
