= Johann Dominicus Fiorillo =

German painter

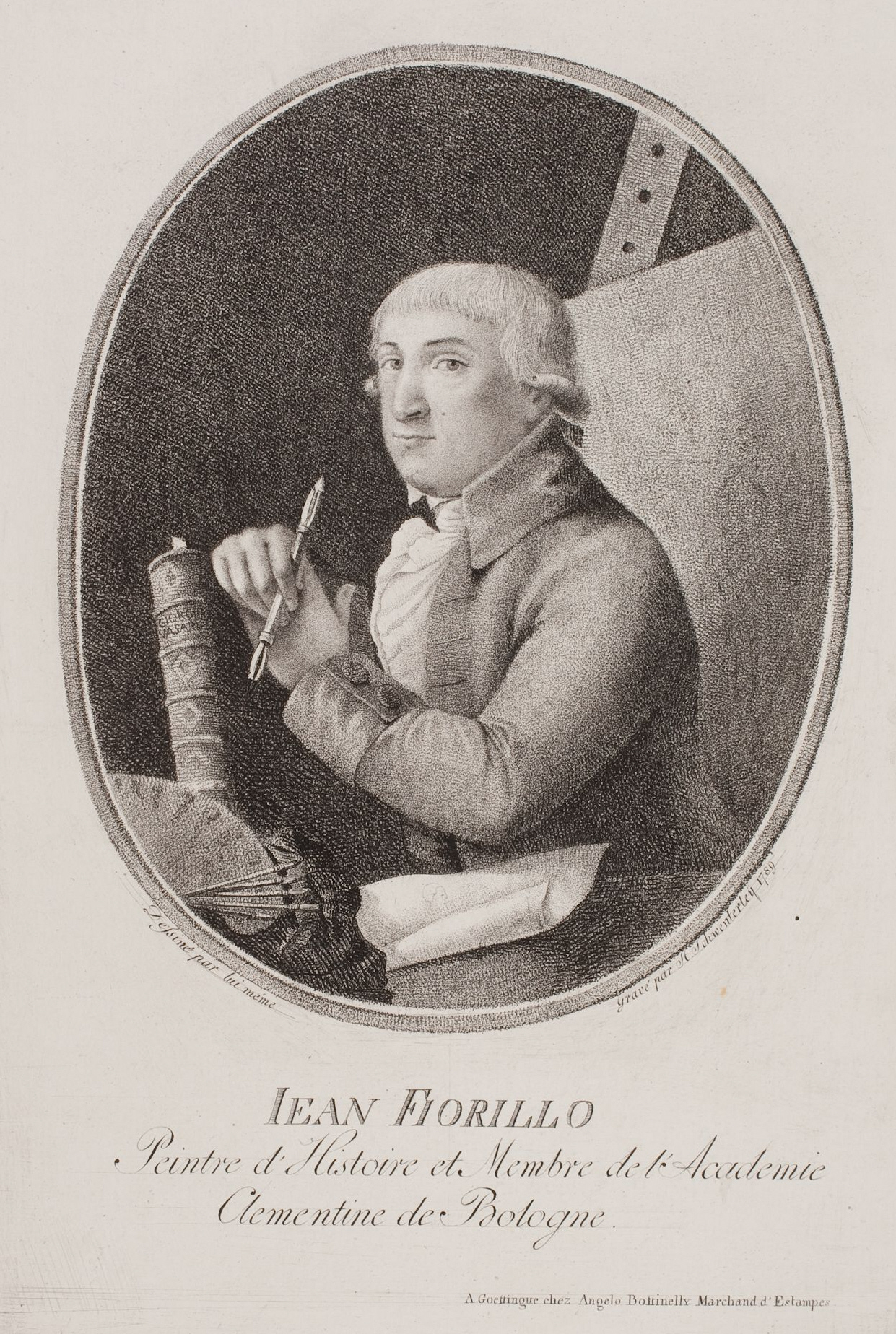
Johann Dominicus Fiorillo

Johann Dominicus Fiorillo (13 October 1748 – 10 September 1821) was a German painter and historian of art.

Fiorillo, a son of Italian composer Ignazio Fiorillo, was born at Hamburg, Holy Roman Empire. He received his first instructions in art at an academy of painting at Bayreuth; and in 1761, to continue his studies, he went first to Rome, and next to Bologna, where he distinguished himself sufficiently to attain in 1769 admission to the academy. Returning soon after to Germany, he obtained the appointment of historical painter to the court of Brunswick.

In 1781 he removed to Göttingen, occupied himself as a drawing master, and was named in 1784 keeper of the collection of prints at the university library. He was appointed professor extraordinary in the philosophical faculty in 1799, and ordinary professor at Göttingen University in 1813. During this period he had made himself known as a writer by the publication of his Geschichte der zeichnenden Künste, in 5 volumes (1798–1808). This was followed in 1815 to 1820 by the Geschichte der zeichnenden Künste in Deutschland und den vereinigten Niederlanden, in 4 volumes. These works, though not attaining to any high mark of literary excellence, are esteemed for the information collected in them, especially on the subject of art in the later Middle Ages. Fiorillo practiced his art almost until his death, but has left no memorable masterpiece. The most noticeable of his painting is perhaps the Surrender of Briseis.

He died at Göttingen.

== See also ==
- List of German painters
