= Tordenskjold (disambiguation) =

Peter Tordenskjold (1691–1720) was a Dano-Norwegian naval hero.

Tordenskjold or Tordenskiold may also refer to:

- Tordenskiold (noble family)
- Tordenskjold Township, Otter Tail County, Minnesota
- Tordenskjoldberget, a mountain on the island of Kongsøya in Kong Karls Land, Svalbard, Norway
- Tordenskiold Oak, a legendary old tree in Horten, Norway
- Danish ironclad Tordenskjold
- HNoMS Tordenskjold, a Norwegian coastal defence ship
  - Tordenskjold-class coastal defence ships

== See also ==
- Thordenskjold Township, Barnes County, North Dakota
