= Battle of Gothenburg =

1717 naval battle of the Great Northern War

- Part of the Great Northern War
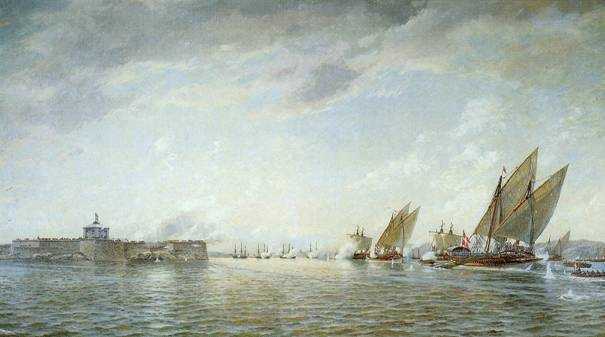
- Fire exchange between Danish ships and the Älvsborg fortress
Date	2–3 May 1717 (O.S.); 13–14 May 1717 (N.S.)
Location	Gothenburg, Sweden 57°41′15″N 11°53′15″E
Result	Swedish victory

Belligerents
Swedish Empire	Denmark-Norway

Commanders and leaders
Olof Strömstierna	Peter Tordenskjold

Strength
6 frigates and several smaller ships 1,600–2,000 men with 400 guns, most on land	2 ships of the line, 2 prams, 9 galleys and 83 smaller ships 4,000 men with 340 guns

Casualties and losses
9 dead	2 galleys 1 pram 52 dead 119 wounded

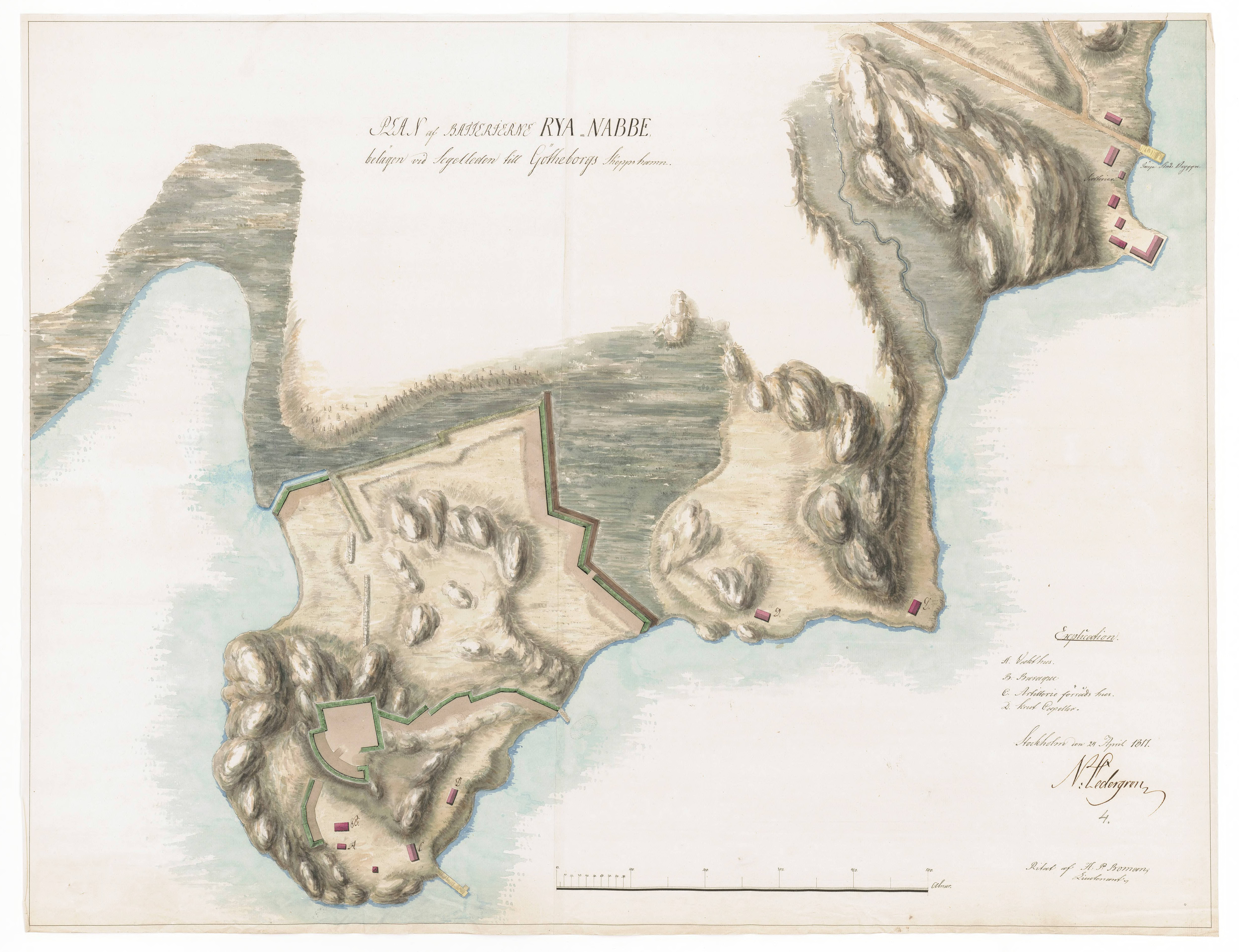
Hand drawn map from 1811 of the batteries on Rya Nabbe.

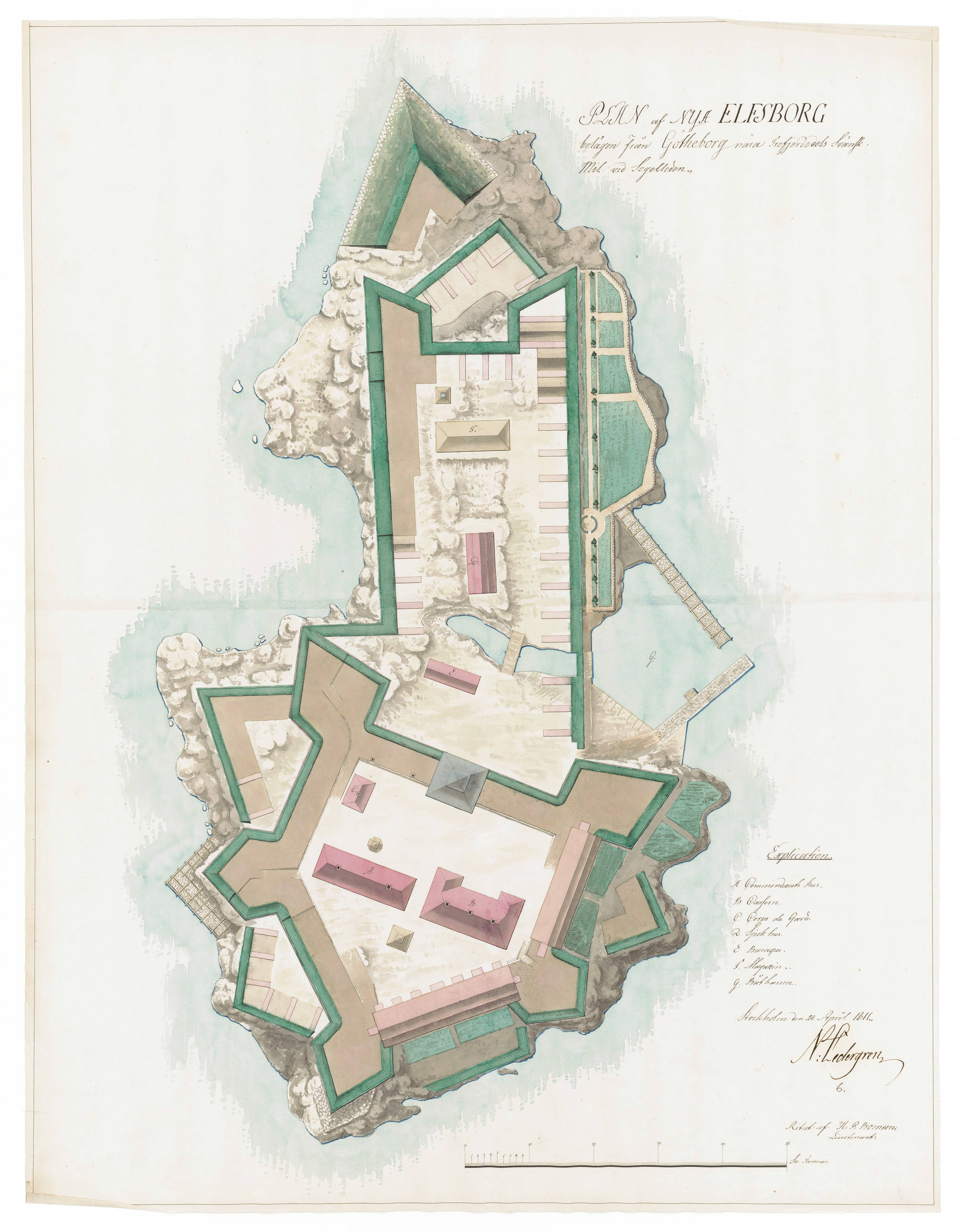
Drawing from 1811 of the New Älvsborg fortress.

The Battle of Gothenburg was a Danish-Norwegian attempt to destroy the Swedish squadron in Gothenburg, which was led by Olof Strömstierna. The Danes were led by the famous Peter Tordenskjold. The Swedish land defence was led by Fredrik of Hessen, and it consisted of the land batteries Billingen and Rya Nabbe with 12 guns each, and the Älvsborg fortress, who had 400 soldiers with 90 guns.

The Danish-Norwegian attack was intended as a surprise attack but failed, after the Swedes opened fire at them after they passed Älvsborg fortress. The bombardment was led as a cross-fire from the fortress and the Swedish ships - which went across the river - against Tordenskjold and his soldiers. After 5 hours of fighting, the Danes and Norwegians retreated after losing several ships.
