= HDMS Tordenskjold (1880) =

Royal Danish Navy warship

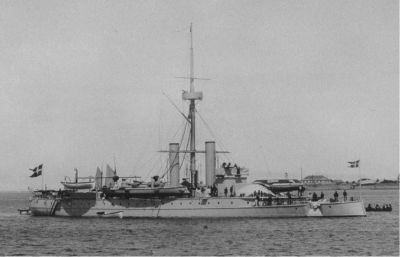
- Tordenskjold

History

Kingdom of Denmark
- Name: Tordenskjold
- Namesake: Vice Admiral Peter Tordenskjold
- Builder: Orlogsværftet, Copenhagen
- Laid down: 5 June 1879
- Launched: 30 September 1880
- Commissioned: 29 September 1882
- Decommissioned: 14 May 1908
- Fate: Scrapped, 1908

General characteristics
- Type: Torpedo ram
- Displacement: 2,534 t (2,494 long tons)
- Length: 67.75 m (222 ft 3 in)
- Beam: 13.23 m (43 ft 5 in)
- Draft: 4.8 m (15 ft 9 in)
- Installed power: 8 cylindrical boilers; 2,600 ihp (1,900 kW)
- Propulsion: 2 shafts, 2 compound-expansion steam engine
- Speed: 13 knots (24 km/h; 15 mph)
- Range: 1,500 nmi (2,800 km; 1,700 mi) at 9 knots (17 km/h; 10 mph)
- Complement: 220
- Armament: 1 × single 35.5 cm MRK L/25 (14 in) gun; 4 × single 120 mm (4.7 in) guns; 4 × single 37 mm (1.5 in) Hotchkiss guns; 1 × single 380 mm (15 in) torpedo tube (bow); 3 × single 350 mm (13.8 in) torpedo tubes
- Armor: Barbette: 203 mm (8 in); Conning tower: 31 mm (1.2 in); Deck: 95 mm (3.7 in)

Tordenskjold was a torpedo ram built for the Royal Danish Navy in the early 1880s. The ship was sold for scrap in 1908.

== Design and description ==
Tordenskjold was 67.75 meters (222 ft 3 in) long, had a beam of 13.23 meters (43 ft 5 in) and a draft of 4.8 meters (15 ft 9 in). She displaced 2,534 metric tons (2,494 long tons) and was fitted with a ram bow. Her crew consisted of 220 officers and enlisted men.

The ship was fitted with a pair of Burmeister & Wain compound-expansion steam engines, each engine driving one propeller shaft using steam provided by eight cylindrical boilers. The engines were rated at a total of 2,600 indicated horsepower (1,900 kW) and gave the ship a speed of 13 knots (24 km/h; 15 mph). Tordenskjold carried a maximum of 170 long tons (173 t) of coal that gave her a range of 1,500 nautical miles (2,800 km; 1,700 mi) at a speed of 9 knots (17 km/h; 10 mph).

The ram's main battery consisted of a single 35.5 cm MRK L/25 gun. Especially for use on board ships, this was a very heavy gun. Obviously, its caliber of 355 mm (14 in) was one of the highest in use. However, for some years its length of 25 calibers (L/25) was also quite good. Length determined the velocity with which projectiles were fired. The gun was mounted in the barbette forward of the superstructure.

The secondary battery consisted of four single 25-caliber 120-millimeter (4.7 in) guns aft, each protected by a gun shield. For defense against torpedo boats, the ship was equipped with four 5-revolving barrel, 37-millimeter (1.5 in), 1-pounder Hotchkiss guns. The ship was also fitted with one 380-millimeter (15 in) and three 355 mm torpedo tubes.

Tordenskjold's waterline was completely unprotected. The barbette was protected by 203 millimeters (8 in) of armor. The deck armor was 95 millimeters (4 in) thick while the conning tower was protected by 31-millimeter (1.2 in) armor plates.

== Construction and service ==
Tordenskjold, named for Vice Admiral Peter Tordenskjold, victor in the 1716 Battle of Dynekilen during the Great Northern War, was laid down on 5 June 1879 by the Orlogsværftet in Copenhagen, launched on 30 September 1880 and commissioned on 29 September 1882.
