= Olof Strömstierna =

Swedish naval officer and admiral

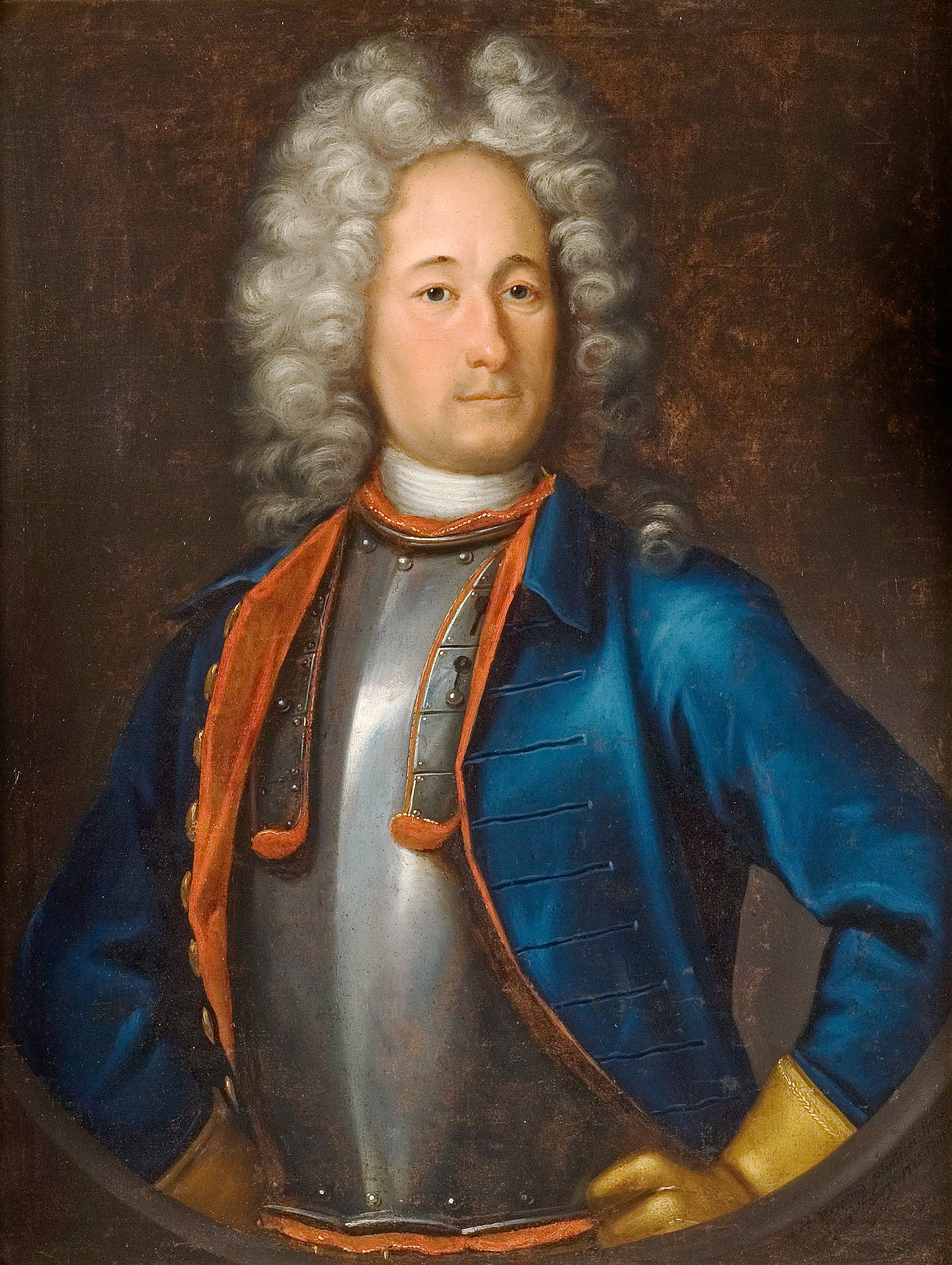

Olof Strömstierna (1664–1730) was a Swedish naval officer and admiral. He was born as Olof Knape but became ennobled under the name Strömstierna in 1715.

== Biography ==
=== Early years and in the Dutch service ===
Strömstierna was born 1664 in Bohuslän where his father, Nils Knape, was a fisherman. Like many people in the archipelago, Strömstierna worked at the sea during his youth. He first sailed domestically, but went to France, England, America, and East Indies in 1697. During these travels he joined the Dutch East India Company and was once in the service of the States-General of the Netherlands, in which reached the rank of lieutenant.

=== The Swedish Navy Staff ===
In 1698, Strömstierna was offered the chance of joining the Swedish navy. He became a captain in 1700, and assisted admiral Cornelius Anckarstierna with the enrollment of "all the existing seamanship in Bohuslän". In 1701, he joined the Swedish expedition to Arkhangelsk in Russia as the head of the frigate Marstrand. Strömstierna became captain of an enlisted sailor company in Bohuslän in 1704. His most important missions were to convoy transport ships, undertake cruises, and protect the Bohuslän coast against Danish attacks. As a reward, he became a schout-bij-nacht in the Gothenburg Squadron in 1714 and was ennobled under the name Strömstierna in 1715.

=== The fighting in Bohuslän against Tordenskjold ===
In 1716, Strömstierna was missioned to convoy a number of transport vessels, loaded with siege artillery and supplies, to Svinesund. When he reached Dynekilen, his flotilla was attacked by Peter Tordenskjold who managed to destroy many of the ships after a five-hour-long battle. For his efforts in the battle, Strömstierna was named vice admiral by the Swedish king Charles XII.

During Strömstierna's subsequent period as commander of the Gothenburg Squadron, he contributed significantly to the repelling of Tordenskjold's attack on the city in 1717. That year he became head of Roddargastarnas Regiment (3,000 men), and in 1718 he led the shipment of over a hundred ships loaded with food and other supplies from Gothenburg to Strömstad, which made the military campaign against Norway possible.

=== The last few years ===
When Strömstierna retired from active service in 1719, the Swedish government raised him to the rank of full admiral. He spent the rest of his years, until his death in 1730, at his farm Vensö in Bohuslän.
