= 40 cm MRK L/25 =

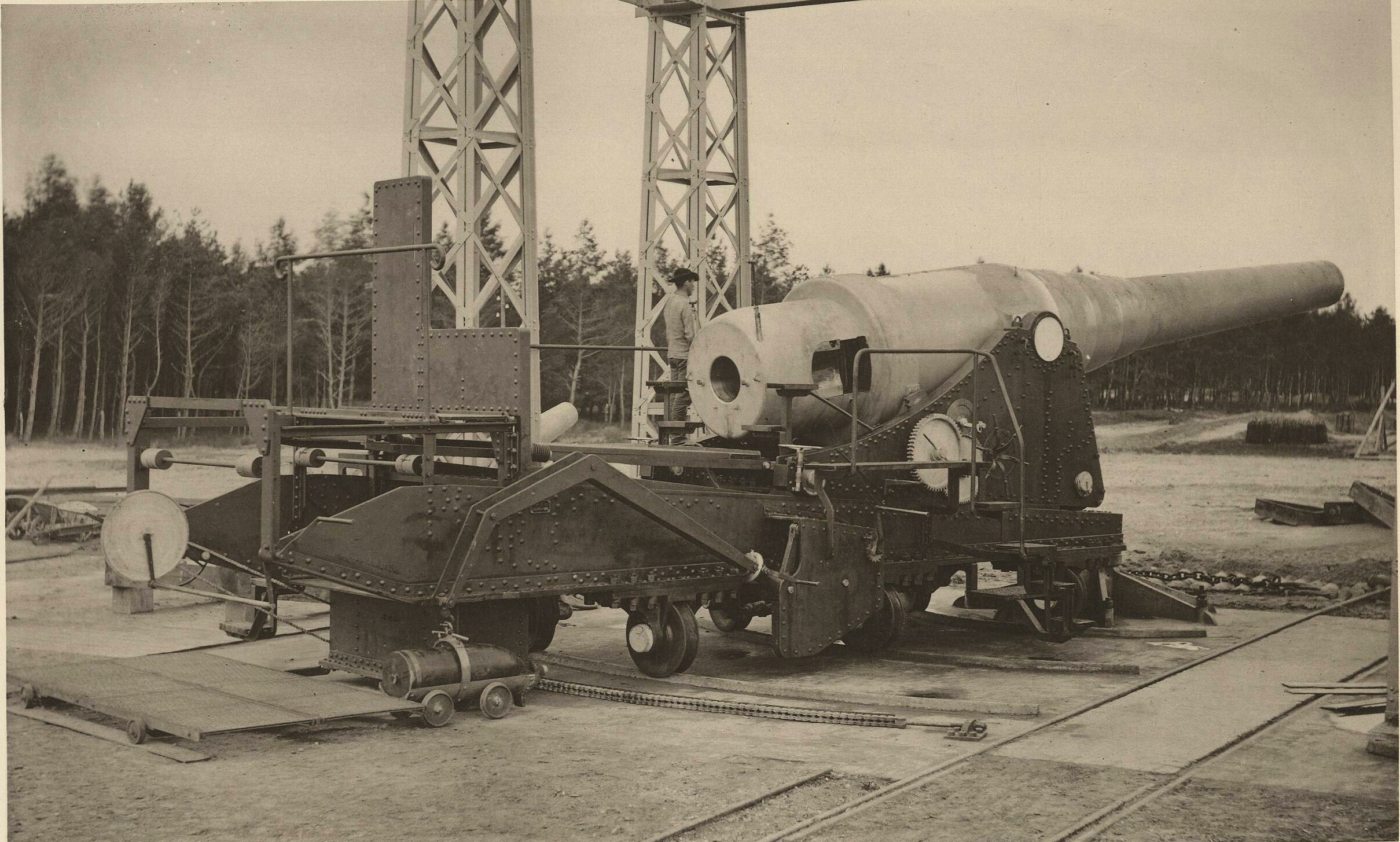
- 40 cm MRK L/25 on coastal carriage in Meppen
- Place of origin: German Empire

Production history
- Designer: Krupp
- Designed: 1878?
- Manufacturer: Krupp
- Produced: 1879
- No. built: 1

Specifications
- Mass: 72,000 kg
- Length: 10,000 mm
- Caliber: 400 mm
- Rate of fire: 1 per 4.8 minutes
- Muzzle velocity: 502.4 m/s

The 40 cm Mantel Ring Kanone L/25, was a 40 cm 25 caliber long Krupp Mantel Ring Kanone (MRK). It was a high caliber, but in restrospect comparatively short, rifled breech loader built-up gun with a Krupp cylindroprismatic sliding breech.

== Context ==
One of the most direct ancestors of the 40 cm MRK L/25 was the smaller 35.5 cm MRK L/25. In June 1878 this gun was tested alongside the 30.5 cm MRK L/25 and a late version of the 15 cm RK L/26. A Dutch officer summarized the tests as involving 'long steel guns of 35, 30 and 15 cm' and 'the short steel gun of 28 cm recently adopted by the Dutch navy' (28 cm A No. 1 gun). These 'long' guns were about 25 calibers long (L/25). It meant that the standard long Krupp gun had now become 25 calibers long (L/25) instead of only L/22. This was confirmed by Krupp then using the label 'lange' for the 30.5 cm L/25.

The 35.5 cm MRK L/25 deserved some special attention. At a weight of 52t against 57.5t for the previous shorter 35.5 cm MRK L/22.5, it was lighter and longer than the gun which had made such a big impression in Philadelphia. This showed that advances in construction and gunpowder manufacturing allowed for longer and/or higher caliber guns without raising the weight of the barrel.

== Development ==
=== International attention ===
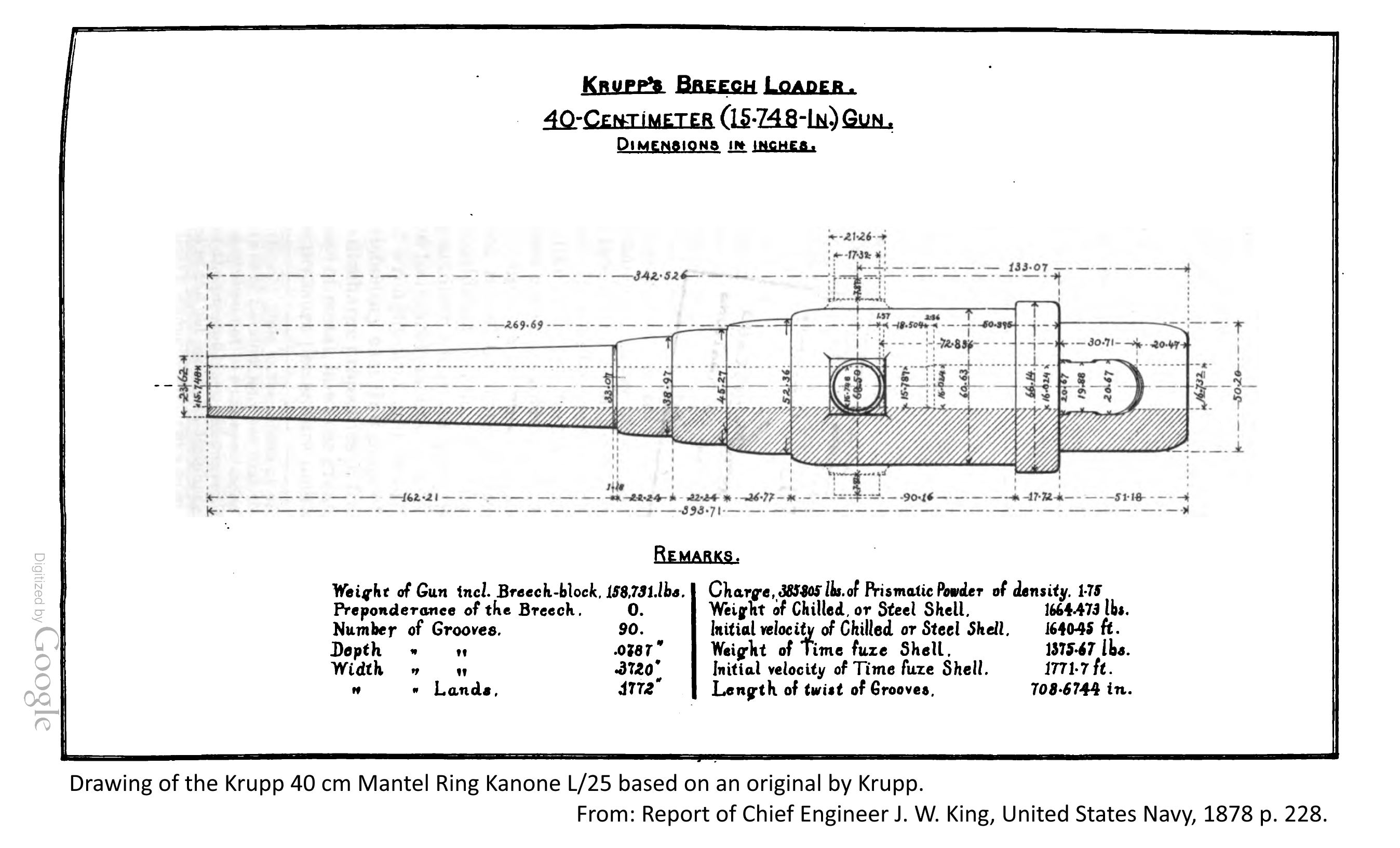
Design drawing by Krupp

The development of the 40 cm MRK L/25 drew international attention even before it was tested. At the time, the British Royal Arsenal at Woolwich, and the Elswick Ordnance Company where building experimental 'Woolwich' and 'Armstrong' guns of about 81 and 100 tons for HMS Inflexible and the Duilio-class ironclads.

In a work updated in March 1878, the gun was mentioned as the most powerful breechloader ever constructed. By then, the gun was ready, but had not yet been tested. A design drawing was published, and a comparison with the experimental British guns was made.

=== Proving the gun in Essen ===
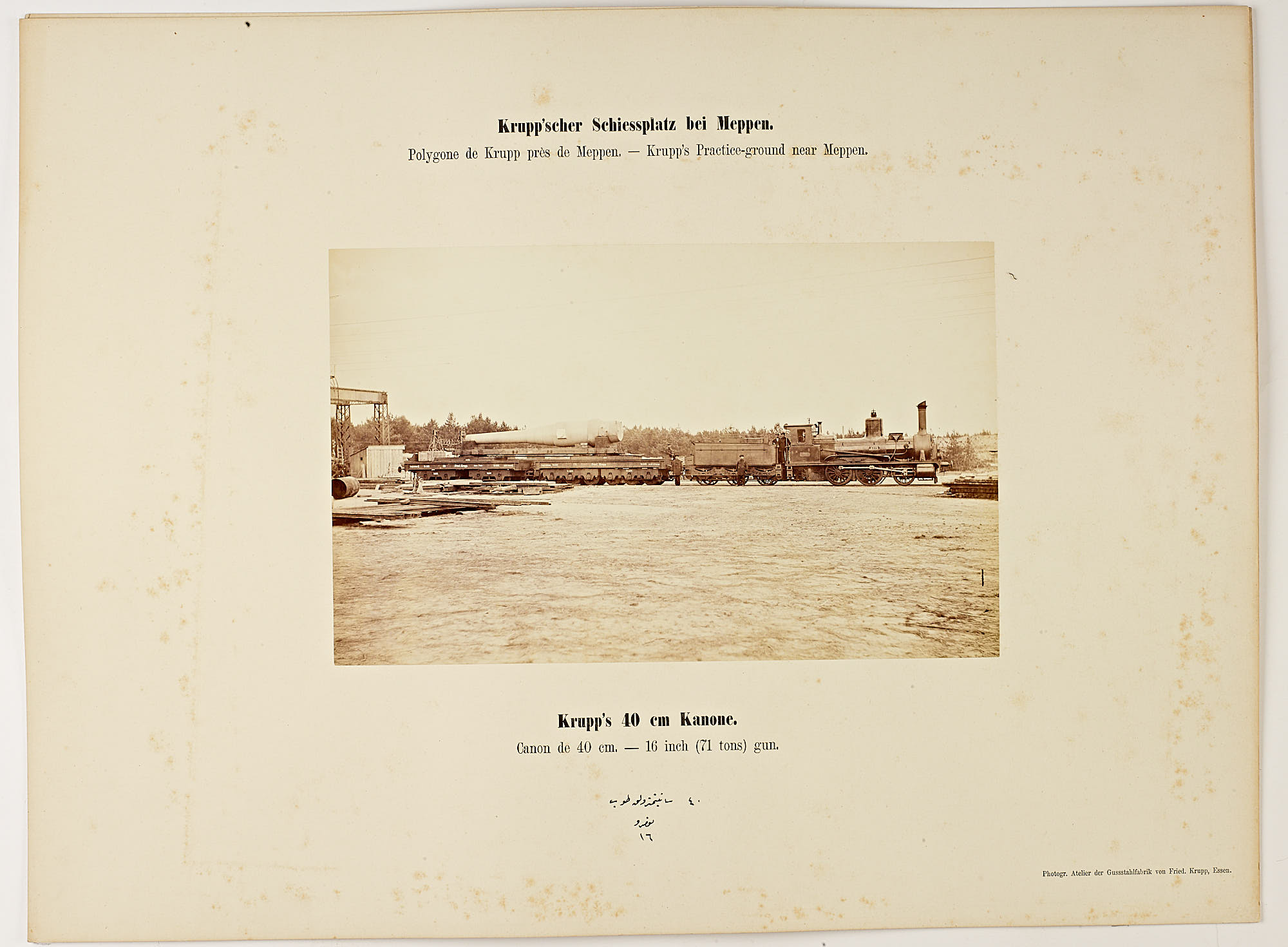
40 cm MRK L/25 on a train near Meppen

On 3 and 6 May 1879, the 40 cm MRK L/25 was proved in Essen. Proving (inschieten) was about checking that the gun was safe, not about whether it would hit a target. Due to innovations, it was also possible to measure velocity and peak pressure during proving.

Proving was done with several kinds of prismatic gunpowder and different charges. During the tests, the gun proved remarkably efficient in the punch that it had per kg of barrel weight. Gas pressures were acceptable, but there was a significant variation depending on the tool that was used to measure it.

=== The August 1879 tests in Meppen ===
In August 1879 about a hundred officers gathered in Münster. These came from all over Europe and from China and Japan. France and Greece were not present. By special trains, they would visit Krupp's shooting trials at Meppen.

The August 1879 tests were primarily about showing the 40 cm MRK L/25. The 35.5 cm MRK L/25, which had already been tested the previous year, was also present as were a range of smaller guns. The takeaway of the tests was that the 40 cm gun could penetrate the heaviest ship armor, i.e. two layers of 30.5 cm each at 5,000 m. As the 35.5 cm L/25 could handle 'only' 45–50 cm at 2,000 m, Krupp had made its point.

During the tests, the gas pressure from the muzzle of the 40 cm gun was so great, that it affected the ground below the muzzle. In order to prevent this, a row of retrieved 15 and 17 cm projectiles had been laid down under the muzzle, see image. Some of these were pushed to a vertical position when the gun was fired.

There is a photograph that shows the gun as it was placed at the firing range, see 40 cm MRK L/25 on coastal carriage in Meppen. Another photo shows the gun on a train at the firing grounds, see 40 cm MRK L/25 on a train near Meppen. There is a description of the gun having been transported to Meppen on two connected carriages. The rear carriage had 6 axles and carried the back of the gun. The front carriage had 4 axles and carried the front of the gun.

=== The Gewerbe- und Kunst-Ausstellung in Düsseldorf ===
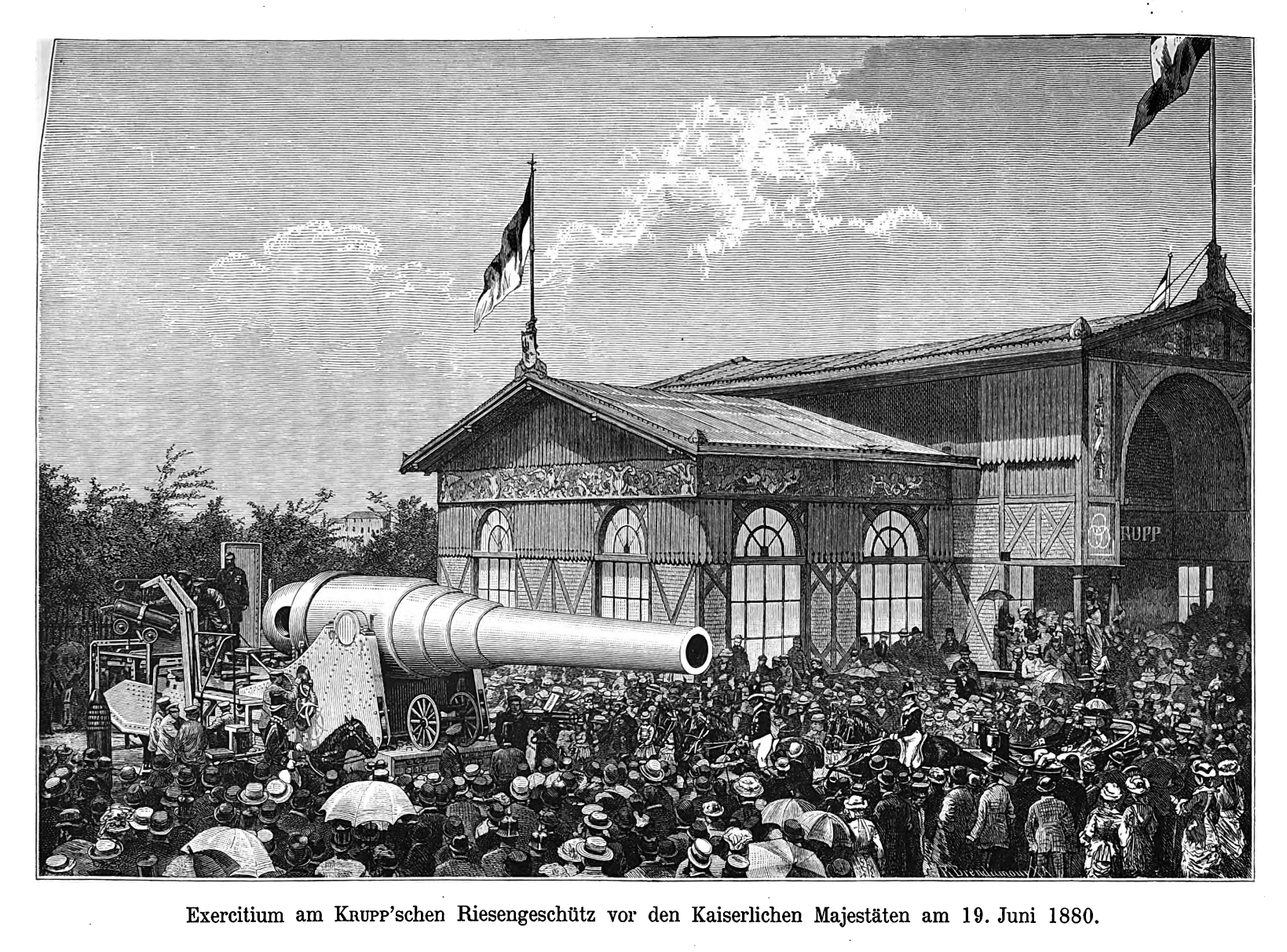
At the Düsseldorf exposition

By 1880, Krupp had created a tradition of revealing its latest and heaviest gun at a World's fair. In 1876, Krupp had shown the 35.5 cm MRK L/22.5 at the Centennial Exposition in Philadelphia. In 1880 the eighth World's fair was the Melbourne International Exhibition. Krupp participated with a limited exhibit. It showed a field gun, railway carriage axles and wheels, and springs for carriages and locomotices. The Krupp exhibit also showed a plate of crucible cast steel of 26 by 5 feet and 9 inch thickness.

In Düsseldorf, a local exhibition took place in 1880. It was called the: Gewerbe-Ausstelllung für Rheinland, Westfalen und Benachbarte Bezirke in Verbindung mit einer Allgemeinen Deutschen Kunst-Austellung und einer Ausstellung Kunstgewerblichter Alterthümer. Krupp participated with a big exhibition in a separate pavilion.

Transporting the 40 cm MRK L/25 gun to the exhibition was done by rail. A small section of the exhibition railway led to just before the Krupp pavilion. Even so, unloading and mounting the gun on its carriage took almost three weeks. On 19 June 1880, the German Emperor visited the Düsseldorf exhibition. They first made a tour of the exhibition, and then stopped at the place were the gun had been placed. The operators of the gun then showed how it could quickly turn on its carriage. The emperor was introduced to Mr. Jänke, representative of the firm.

== Characteristics ==
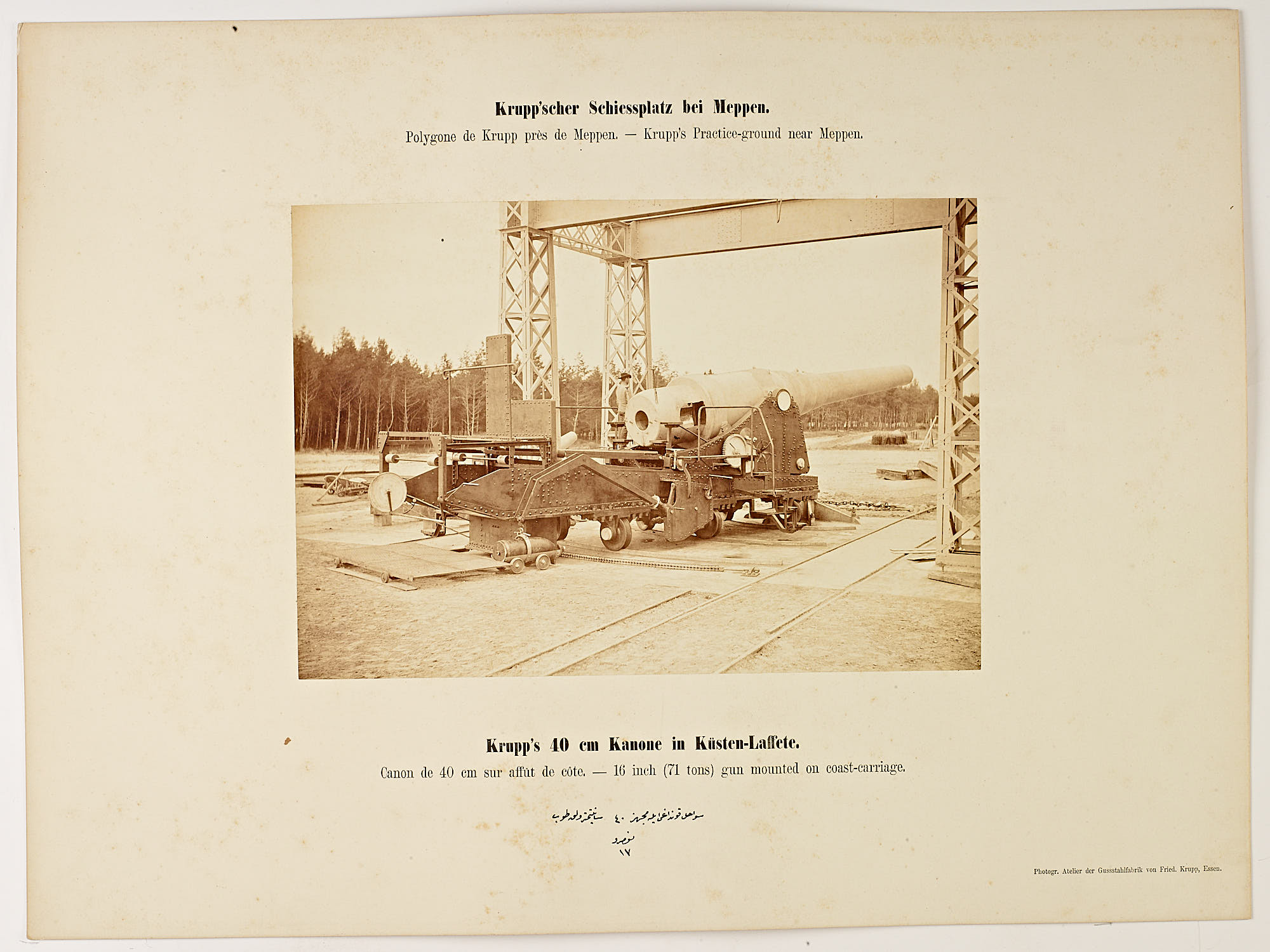
A print mentioning the 71 tons in the English caption

The 40 cm MRK L/25 weighed 72,000 kg (71 tons). The barrel was 10,000 mm long with a length of bore of 8,711 mm. It had 90 grooves that were 9.45 mm wide and 2 mm deep. The lands in between the grooves were 4.5 mm wide. The twist length was 45 caliber.

The charge of the gun was meant to be 200 kg in four bags. In the August 1879 test, average velocity was 502.4 m/s. At 2,500 m, this was about 434 m/s.

In August 1879, the gun was tested while it was mounted on a coastal carriage. This was a sliding carriage with a hydraulic break that caught the recoil. The carriage had an exceptional firing height of 2,960 mm. It had a crane to lift the iron projectiles. This could be brought down to pick up a projectile and then be brought up again by a powerful spring. Lifting the projectiles took between 20 and 30 seconds.

The carriage weighed 45,000 kg, of which the upper carriage weighed 12,400 kg. Maximum elevation was 16 and maximum declination was 6 degrees.

In August 1879, 15 men operated the gun.

The projectiles that were tested in 1879 had a length of 2.8 caliber. The armor-piercing shell weighed 775 kg, the regular shell 640 kg.

== Use ==
The August 1879 test of the 40 cm MRK L/25 in Meppen also involved a lot of other guns. Most notable were a 24 cm L/25.5 gun and a 15 cm MRK L/28 (see 15 cm MRK L/30). A Dutch observer noted that these 24 and 15 cm guns used a relatively higher charge, and had a very short twist length. Longer projectiles had been designed for both, but were only ready for the 15 cm gun. The observer called these guns: 'guns of increased power'. He noted that after enough experiments, the innovative aspects of these guns would also be applied to calibers higher than 24 cm.

Of course, these innovations were generally noted by artillery specialists. It was therefore not likely that anybody would order the 40 cm MRK L/25 that had been made. In 1880, Krupp published a table detailing the specifications of its future gun models which included the innovations mentioned, the so-called Pattern C/80. A 40 cm gun would be offered with a length of L/30 and L/35. Both models would shoot a 740 kg steel grenade with a charge of 295 kg. This made the 40 cm MRK L/25 obsolete. Later, a 40 cm L/25 was also offered, but this was a C/80 gun like the longer ones. The C/80 pattern led to the order of the 40 cm MRK L/35 by the Italian government.
