= Tordenskiold Oak =

Oak tree in Horten, Norway

Coordinates: 59°25.962′N 10°27.257′E

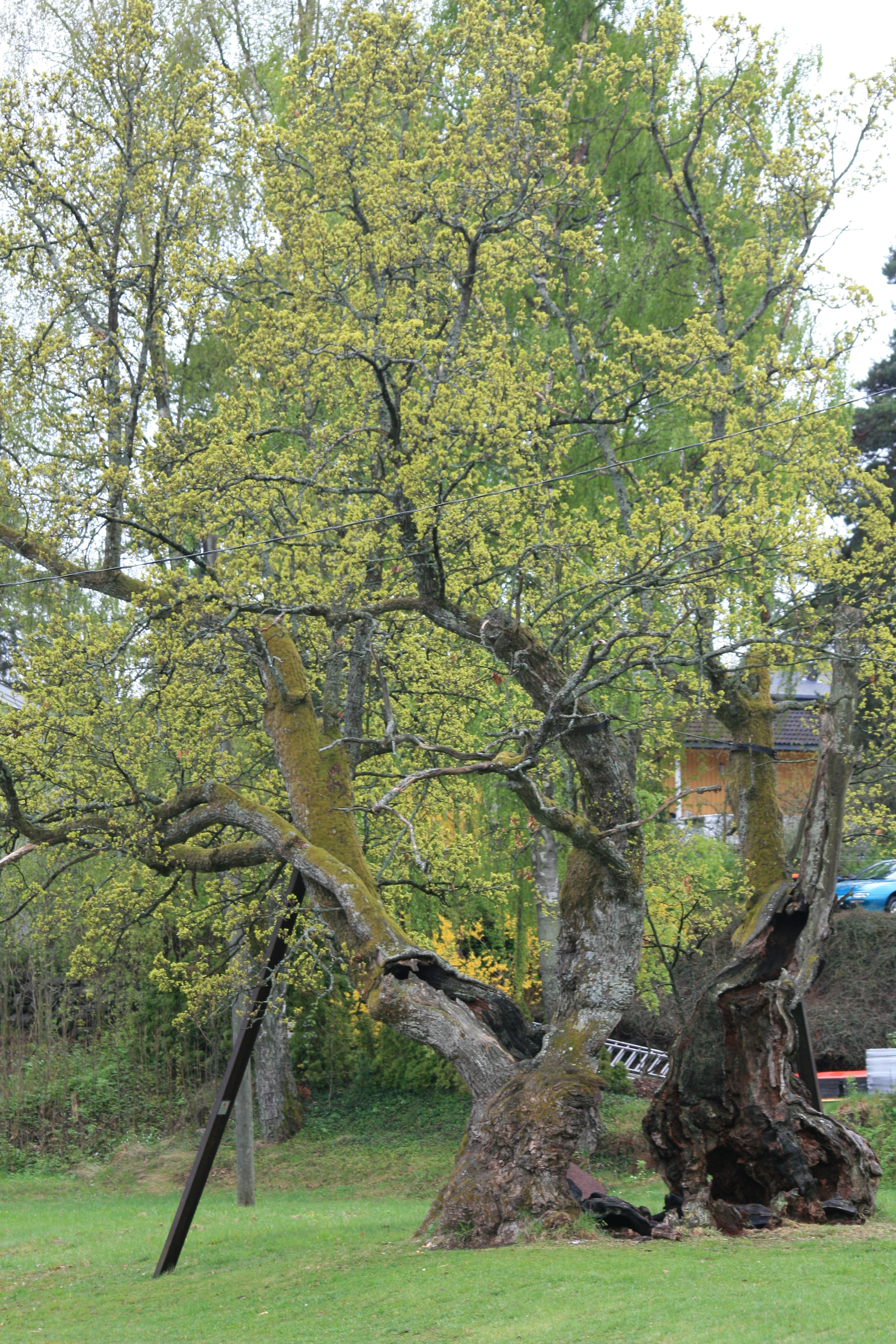
Tordenskiold Oak

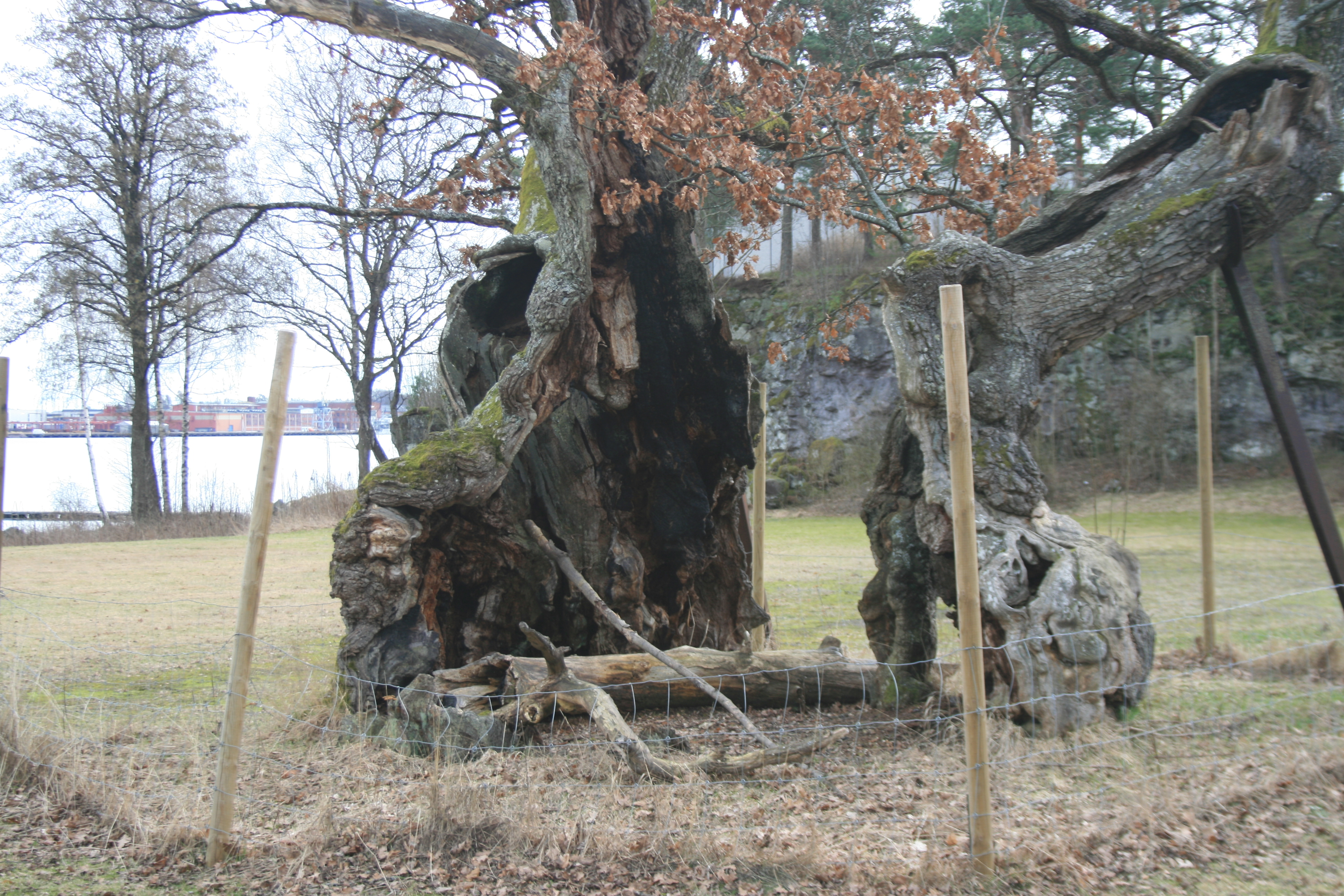
Support pillars and wires hold the tree trunk together to keep the tree alive. The "Tordenskiold Bay" in the background.

The Tordenskiold Oak (Norwegian: Tordenskioldeika) is one of the oldest trees in Norway. The tree is located in Kjølhalskogen in Horten Municipality in Vestfold county. The tree trunk is very hollow, so the tree is almost split in two. The oak was protected by a royal decree on December 9, 1921. It is not possible to say how old the tree is, but it goes for at least 800, maybe close to 1,000 years. The tree has been supported and bolted to hold the trunk together, and a fence has been set up around the tree as a hedge on the day it falls.

The biggest threat to the tree was in 1993, when it was discussed both to lift the conservation and to have the heavily enclosed tree removed. Local environmental protection authorities were concerned about the safety, but lacked the financial means to take adequate security (fencing). However, these plans led to great local involvement in the city, and much publicity in the local newspaper Gjengangeren, where a fundraising event was discussed. At that time, former Mayor Jon Brekke pointed out that oak represents an important part of the city's identity, and is a very important cultural heritage worth preserving.

== The legend ==
About this oak it is said that admiral Peter Wessel Tordenskiold used it as a bollard when he was to moor his ship, and when the ship was to be keeled, the tree turned around. The bay by the tree is also nicknamed Tordenskjoldbukta (Tordenskiold Bay).
