= Battle of Dynekilen =

1716 naval battle of the Great Northern War

Coordinates: 59°00′30″N 11°13′18″E

- Part of the Great Northern War
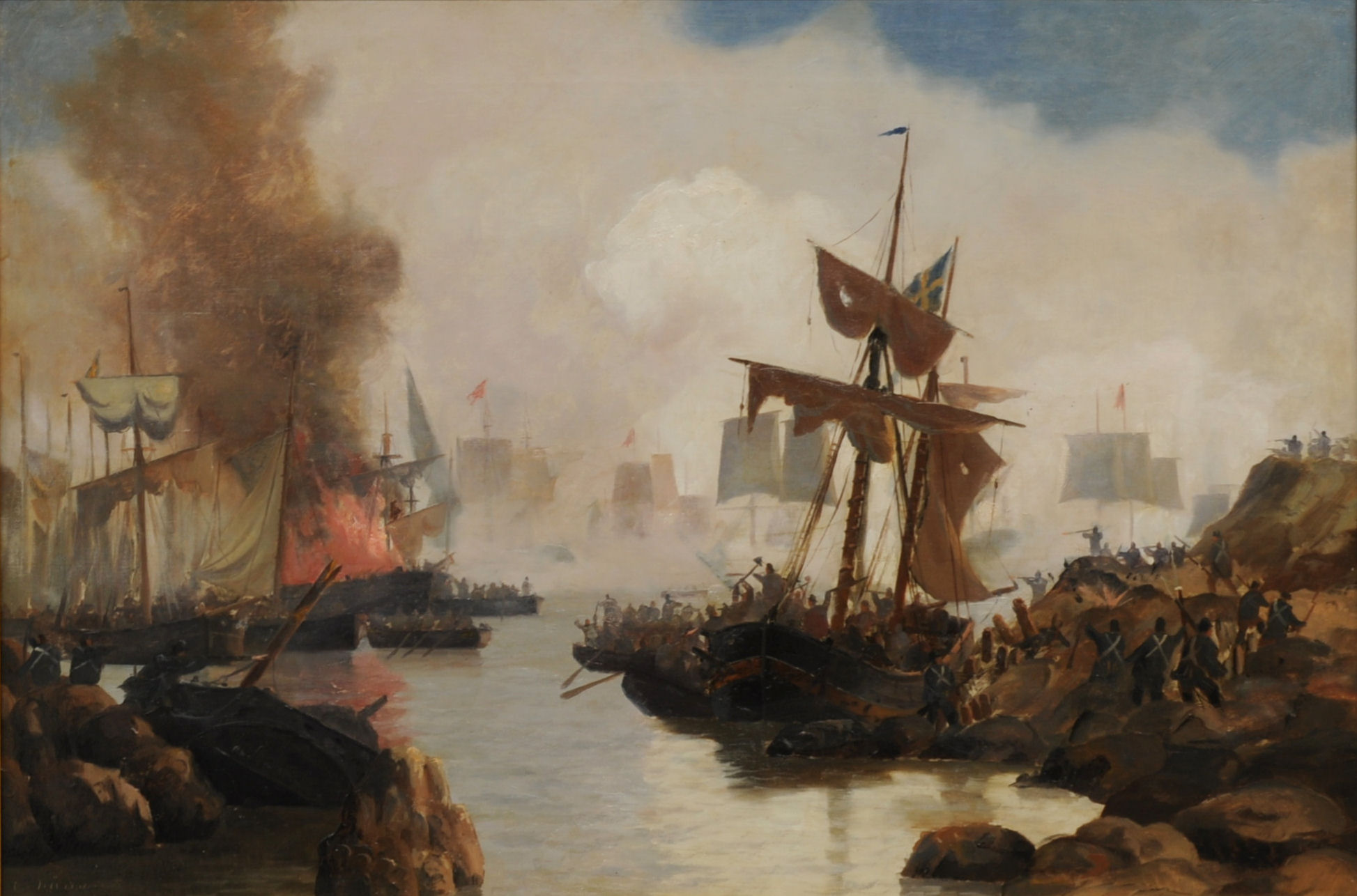
- Tordenskjold i Dynekilen by Carl Neumann
Date	28 June 1716 (O.S.); 8 July 1716 (N.S.)
Location	Bohuslän
Result	Dano-Norwegian victory

Belligerents
(yes) Swedish Empire	Denmark–Norway

Commanders and leaders
(Swedish Empire) Olof Strömstierna	(Denmark–Norway) Peter Tordenskjold

Strength
1,284 men 13 warships, 14 merchant vessels, 1 land battery with 40 heavy cannons and 72 light cannons in total (Note: The exact strength of the Swedish force is unknown. According to sources, there were between 12 and 15 warships and 8 to 29 merchant vessels, with 13 warships and 14 merchant vessels being considered the most likely figure in modern literature.)	931 men 7 warships with 97 heavy cannons, 38 light cannons and 2 howitzers in total

Casualties and losses
9 warships captured, 4 warships sunk, 5 merchants captured, 9 merchants destroyed (Note: According to a letter written by Tordenskjold, the Swedes lost 9 warships captured by the Norwegians and 4 sunk by their own crew, and 5 merchants captured and 3 destroyed and sunk by their own crew. However, according to other sources, all of the Swedish ships were lost, resulting in a figure of 9 merchants destroyed. Some sources speak of 44 Swedish ships lost, of which 30 captured.); 21 men or more captured, unknown number of killed and wounded	19 killed, 57 wounded

The naval Battle of Dynekilen (Danish: Slaget ved Dynekilen) took place on 8 July 1716 during the Great Northern War between a Dano-Norwegian fleet under Peter Tordenskjold and a Swedish fleet under Olof Strömstierna. The battle resulted in a Dano-Norwegian victory.

== Background ==
After Sweden lost at the Battle of Poltava, Frederik IV of Denmark, the Danish-Norwegian king, declared war against Sweden on 28 October 1709.

In the naval enactment, a light Danish-Norwegian force of seven ships under Peter Tordenskjold trapped and defeated a Swedish transport fleet of 44 ships in Dynekilen fjord, just north of Strömstad, on the west coast of Sweden. The Swedish transport fleet was transporting troops, ammunition and supplies from Gothenburg, destined for the land forces under the command of Charles XII invading Norway.

== Battle ==
The Danish-Norwegian flotilla ambushed the Swedish fleet while it was positioned in the harbour of Dynekilen. In the process, it overcame and destroyed a small island fort equipped with six 12-pounder guns positioned in the harbour entrance. The largest Swedish ship, Stenbock, a former ship of the line converted into a cannon barge, surrendered, after which the lighter vessels were run aground, and an attempt made to destroy most of them. The Dano-Norwegian forces worked to put out fires and salvage as many of the ships as possible. They managed to save and capture 30 ships, while 14 ships, consisting of various galleys and transport ships, were successfully destroyed by the Swedish. Swedish land forces continued to fire muskets from the surrounding hills during these operations, eventually forcing Tordenskjold to leave, but not preventing him from taking with him all of 30 captured Swedish ships. The Dano-Norwegian force suffered 76 casualties, 19 killed and 57 wounded.

On account of the loss of this transport fleet at Dynekilen, Charles XII was forced to abandon the invasion of Norway and withdraw his troops to Sweden, where he was soon preoccupied with setting up defences against the expected combined Danish and Russian invasion force.

== Ships involved ==
=== Denmark–Norway (Tordenskjold) ===
- Hjælper 47 (barge)
- Hvide Ørn 30 (frigate)
- Vindhund 16 (frigate)
- Charlotte Amalia 7 (galley)
- Louisa 7 (galley)
- Prinds Christian 7 (galley)

=== Sweden ===
- Stenbock 24 (barge) - Surrendered
- Proserpina 5 (galley) - Captured
- Ulysses 5 (galley) - Captured
- Lucretia 12 (galley) - Captured
- Wreden 21 (galley) - Sunk, later salvaged by the Swedes.
- Achilles 5 (half-galley) - Captured
- Pollux 5 (half-galley) - Captured
- Hector 5 (half-galley) - destroyed.
- Castor 5 (half-galley) - Sunk, later salvaged by the Swedes
- Biorn 4 (double-sloop) - Captured
- Svarte Maeren 4 (double-sloop) - Captured
- Schelpaden 12 (Gallioth) - Sunk, later salvaged by the Swedes
- Transports - 5 captured, 3 destroyed

All according to Tordenskjold's own report.

== Sources ==
- Adamson, Hans Christian Admiral Thunderbolt: The Spectacular Career of Peter Wessel, Norway's Greatest Sea Hero (Chilton Co., Book Division. 1959)
- Andersson, R.C. Naval Wars in the Baltic 1522–1850 (Francis Edwards Ltd. 1969) ISBN 978-0-902476-00-4
- Bergersen, Olav Tordenskiolds Brev (Universitetsforlaget, Trondheim 1963)
- Bjerg, Hans Christian Tordenskiold: Glimt af Wessel (Borgan. 1990) ISBN 978-87-7466-181-8
- Christiansen, Per Jeg vil synge om en helt: et biografisk skrift i anledning 300-arsjubileet for Peter Wessel Tordenskiolds fødsel (Ringve museum. 1990) ISBN 978-82-990305-5-7
- Kavli, Guthorm I Tordenskjolds Kjølvann (Schibsted. 1990) ISBN 82-516-1352-3
