= Tordenskiold (noble family) =

- Nobility
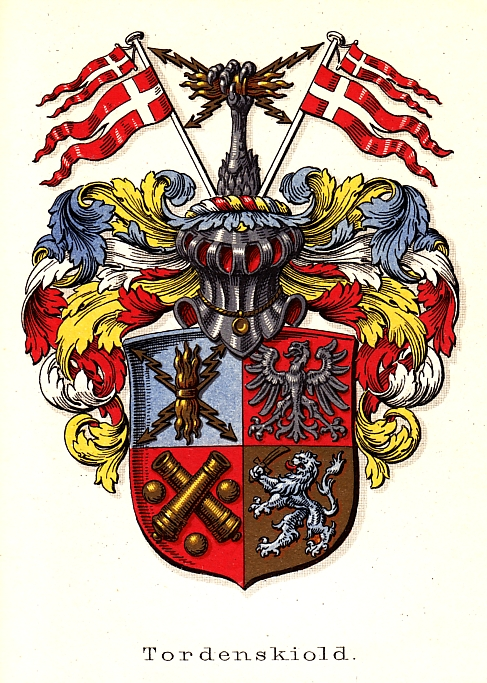
- Tordenskiold coat of arms
- Country: Denmark; Norway
- Founded: 24 February 1716
- Founder: Peter Tordenskjold

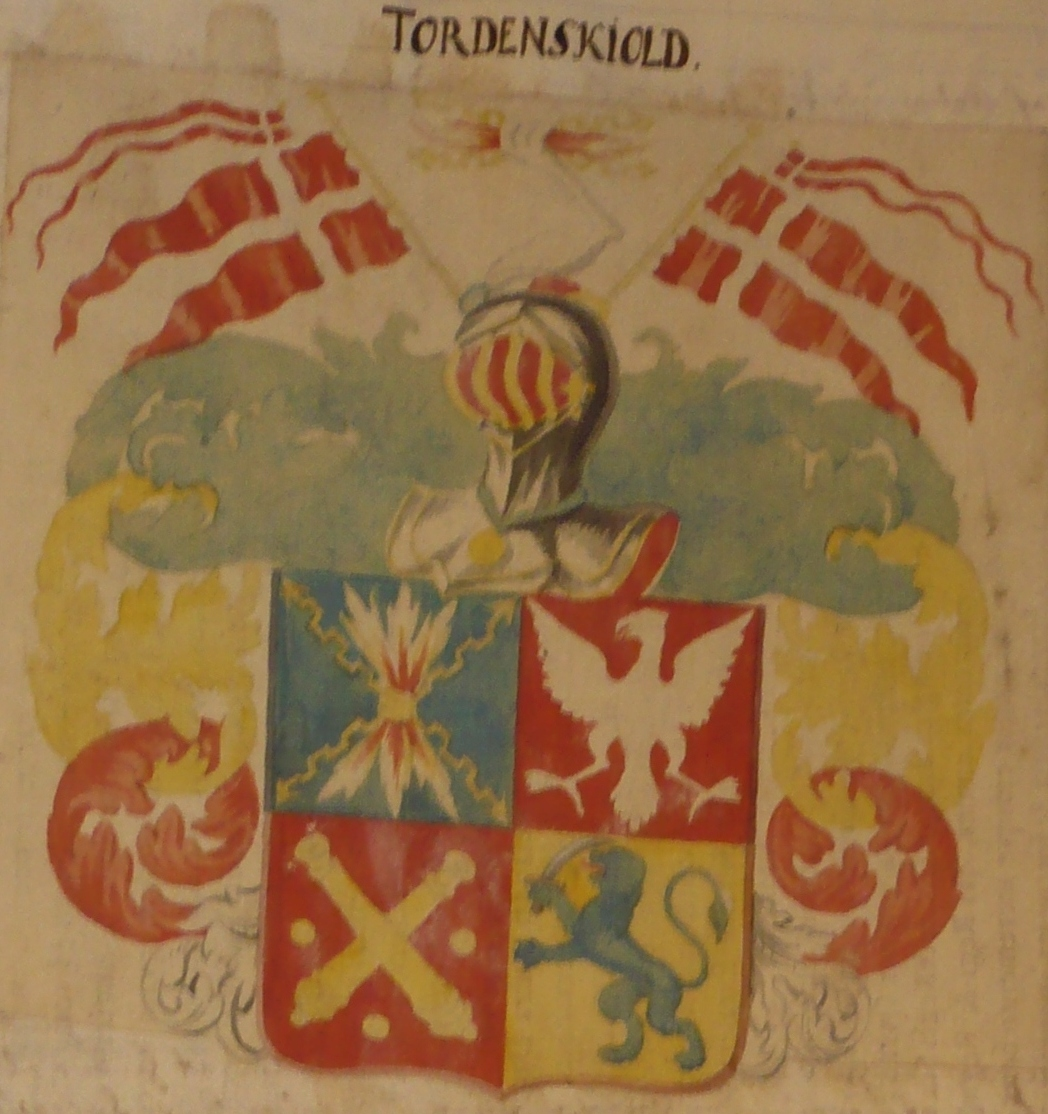
The coat of arms of Peter Tordenskiold and his nephew Johan Christopher Tordenskiold.

The Tordenskiold family was the name of two dignities in the Danish and the Norwegian nobility. Both are today patrilineally extinct.

== Tordenskiold I ==
Peter Jansen Wessel was a Norwegian/Danish naval hero who for his braveness was ennobled under the name Tordenskiold. It happened by letter of nobility on 24 February 1716. Peter Tordenskiold died at a young age and without issue, wherefore this noble dignity became extinct.

Peter Tordenskiold's brother Caspar Jansen Wessel was in 1720 ennobled under the name von Wessel.

== Tordenskiold II ==
Peter Tordenskiold's nephew Johan Christopher Christophersen Wessel (born on 4 July 1727, died on 6 February 1793) was later, in 1761, ennobled under the same name and with the same arms as his uncle.

Johan Christopher Tordenskiold was the son of Christopher Jansen Wessel and Karen Nielsdatter Bie. He was married and had issue.

== See also ==
- Danish nobility
- Norwegian nobility

== Literature and sources ==
- Wikipedia, English: Peter Tordenskjold (Per 12 April 2011.)
- Wikipedia, Danish: Peter Wessel Tordenskiold (Per 12 April 2011.)
- Wikipedia, Norwegian Bokmål & Riksmål: Peter Wessel (Per 12 April 2011.)
- Wikipedia, Norwegian Bokmål & Riksmål: Wessel (slekt) (Per 12 April 2011.)
- Store norske leksikon: Peter Wessel Tordenskiold
- Store norske leksikon Peter Wessel Tordenskiold – utdypning
