= Peter Tordenskjold =

Royal Dano-Norwegian Navy officer (1690–1720)

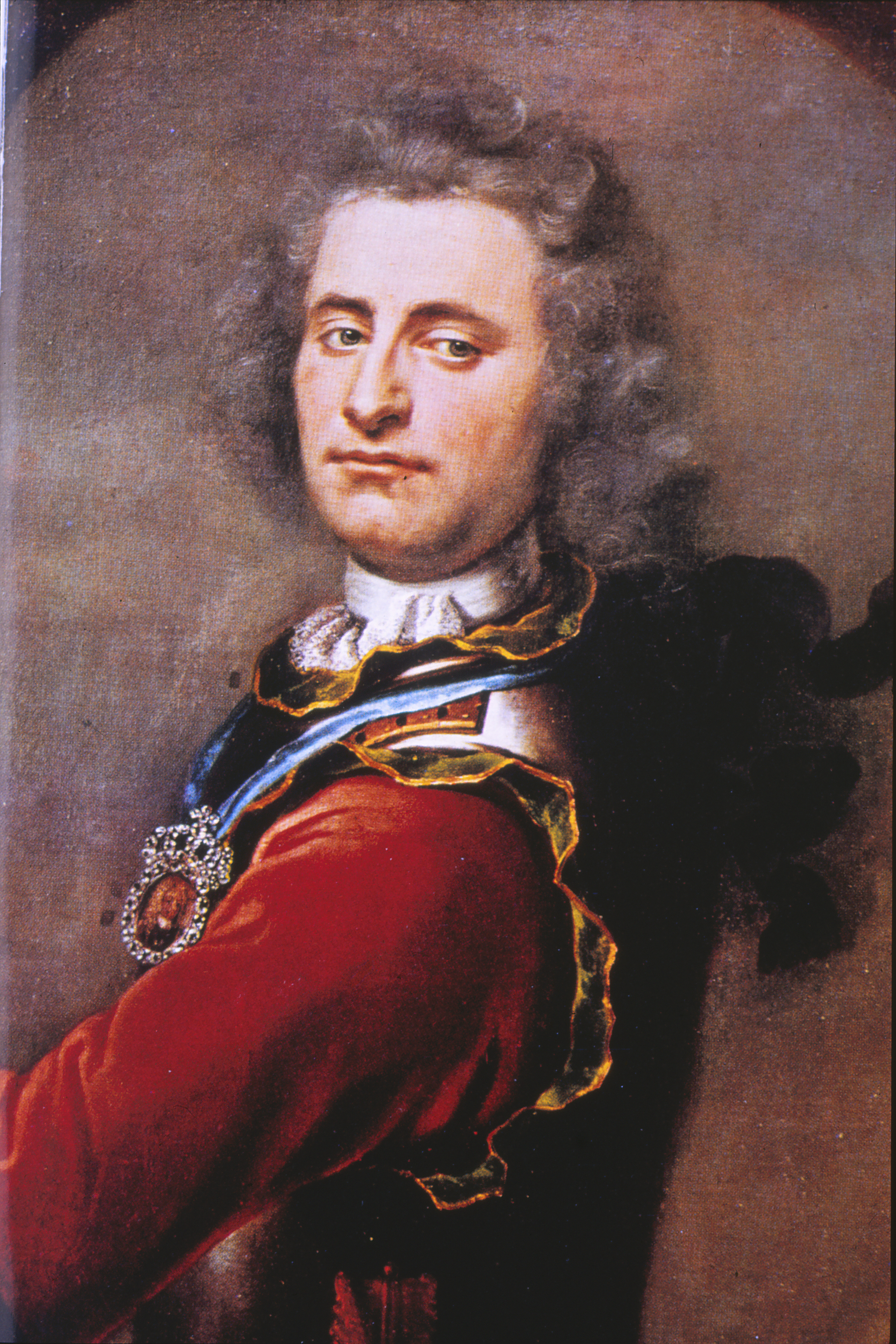
- Portrait by Balthasar Denner, 1719
- Born: 28 October 1690; Trondheim, Norway, then part of Denmark-Norway
- Died: 12 November 1720 (aged 30); Hildesheim, Cologne
- Burial place: Holmen Church
- Military career
- Allegiance: Denmark-Norway
- Branch: Royal Dano-Norwegian Navy
- Service years: 1705–1720
- Rank: Vice admiral
- Units: Løvendals Galej; Ormen (ship); Hvide Ørn; Kattegat Squadron
- Conflicts: Great Northern War; Battle of Lindesnes; Battle of Kolberg; Battle of Rügen (1715); Battle of Haslund; Battle of Gothenburg; Battle of Dynekilen; Battle of Strömstad; Battles at Göta Älv; Attack on Marstrand
- Awards: Order of the Dannebrog, Knight of the Order of the Dannebrog

Peter Jansen Wessel Tordenskiold (28 October 1690 – 12 November 1720) was a Norwegian naval officer and Vice-Admiral of the Royal Dano-Norwegian fleet during the Great Northern War. Born in Trondheim, he travelled to Copenhagen in 1704 and eventually joined the navy, rising to the rank of vice-admiral.

In 1716, his courage and audacity had earned him both renown and ennoblement. Frederick IV of Denmark-Norway crowned the distinction by conferring upon him the name of Tordenskiold ("Thunder Shield"), by which posterity has chiefly known him. His greatest exploit came later that year, when he captured almost the entire transport fleet of the Swedish Navy at the Battle of Dynekilen, fought against the backdrop of the First Norwegian Campaign and concurrent preparations for a joint Russian-Danish crossing of Øresund. The Norwegian national regiments had brought the Swedish advance to a standstill early in the Campaign, and successive reverses had since then compelled the Swedish army to conduct a fighting retreat towards the frontier. Charles XII of Sweden nevertheless refused to abandon the campaign until Tordenskiold's daring raid extinguished the last realistic prospect of the Swedes regrouping and resuming the offensive from Norwegian territory.

Still only in his twenties, Tordenskiold reached the pinnacle of his career after Dynekilen. Promoted to vice admiral, he crowned his wartime service with the capture of Marstrand and the vital maritime stronghold of Carlsten. Less than a year later, however, the meteoric rise of Peter Tordenskiold ended abruptly when he was killed in a duel near Hanover.

== Name ==
His birth name was Peter Jansen Wessel. His name occurs with spellings as Peder and Pitter. Upon his ennoblement in 1716, he received the name Tordenskiold meaning 'thunder shield'. This was also the orthographical form which he used. In newer times, the form Tordenskjold has become usual.

== Biography ==
Born in Trondheim in Norway, he was the tenth child of alderman Jan Wessel and the brother of later Rear-Admiral Caspar von Wessel. Peter Wessel was a wild, unruly lad who gave his pious parents much trouble, eventually stowing away on a ship heading for Copenhagen in 1704. In Copenhagen, he unsuccessfully sought to become a navy cadet. He befriended the king's chaplain, Peder Jespersen, who sent Wessel on a voyage to the West Indies and finally procured a vacant cadetship for him. After further voyages, this time to the East Indies, Wessel was appointed second lieutenant in the Royal Danish-Norwegian Navy on 7 July 1711 and went on to serve on the frigate Postillion. While on Postillion, he befriended Norwegian admiral baron Waldemar Løvendal, who was the first to recognize the young man's potential as a naval officer. Løvendal soon made Peter Wessel the captain of the four-gun sloop Ormen (HMS Serpent).

=== Early service ===
Wessel started his navy service during the Great Northern War against Sweden, cruising about the Swedish coast in Ormen picking up useful information about the enemy. In June 1712, Løvendal promoted him to the 18-gun warship Løvendals Galej, against the advice of the Danish admiralty, who considered Wessel unreliable. After officially complaining about his dreary commanding officer Daniel Jacob Wilster in Norway, Wessel was transferred to the Baltic Sea command of Ulrik Christian Gyldenløve, who appreciated and utilized Wessel's courage. Wessel was already renowned for two things: the audacity with which he attacked any Swedish vessels he came across regardless of the odds and his unique seamanship, which always enabled him to evade capture.

The Great Northern War had now entered its later stage when Sweden, beset on every side by foes, employed her fleet principally to transport troops and stores to the distressed Swedish Pomerania provinces. The audacity of Wessel impeded her at every point. He was continually snapping up transports, dashing into the fjords where her vessels lay concealed and holding up her detached frigates. He was a part of Gyldenløve's fleet which succeeded in destroying a large number of Swedish transport ships at Rügen on 29 September 1712, and was promoted from second lieutenant to captain lieutenant. His successes compelled the Swedes to post a reward for his capture, while his free and easy ways also won him enemies in the Danish navy, who deplored his almost privateer-like conduct.

=== Court-martial ===
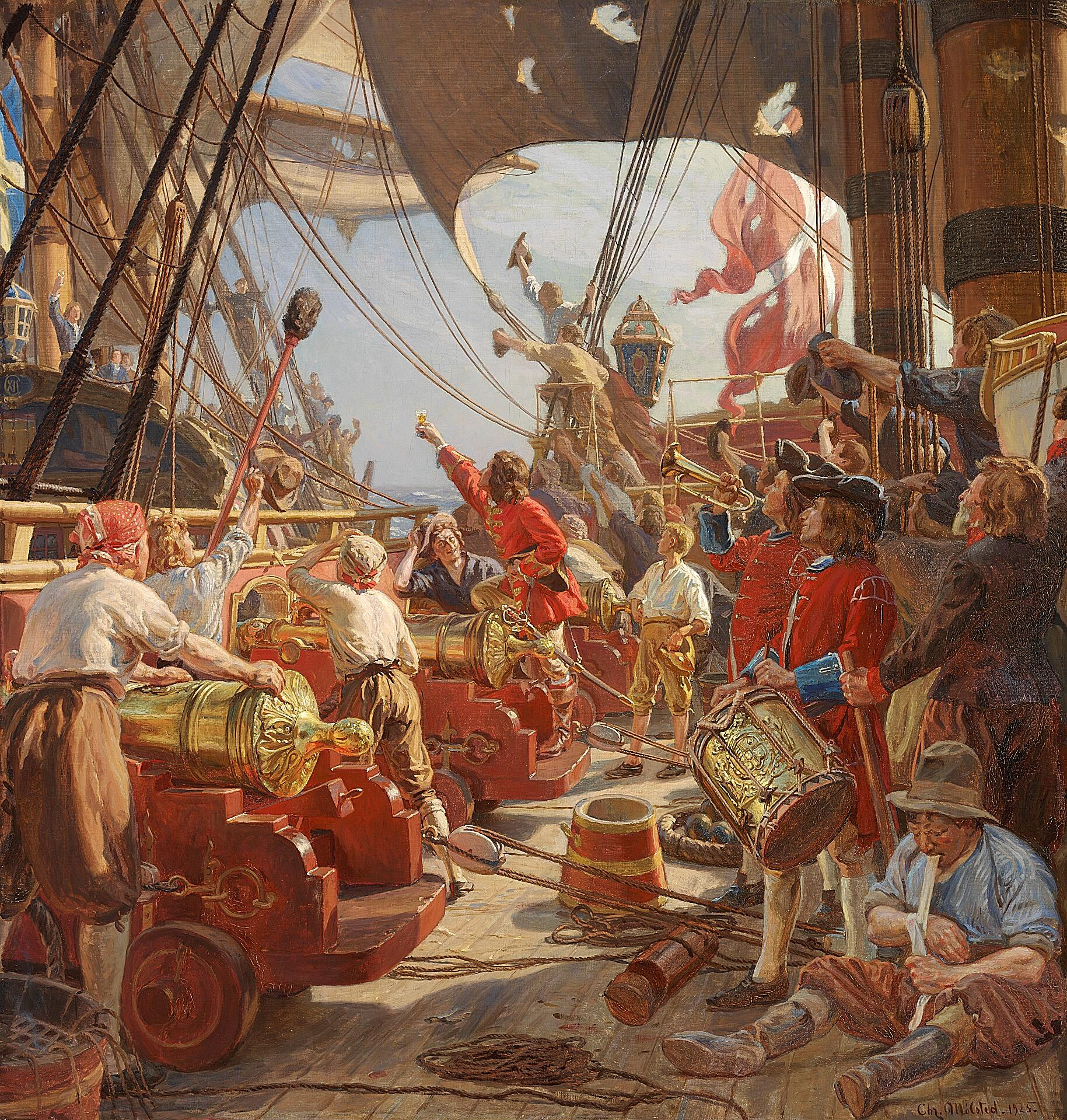
1925 painting of Wessel toasting the crew of Olbing Galley by Christian Mølsted

In June 1714, Wessel, commanding Løvendals Galei, began cruising off the Norwegian coast in search of a Swedish privateer spotted near Bergen. Unable to locate the privateer, Wessel sailed southwards to intercept Swedish privateers in the North Sea bound for Gothenburg. On 26 July at 2pm, Løvendals Galei, flying a Dutch ensign, encountered a frigate flying a British ensign off Lindesnes. The two ships saluted each other and sailed away before the other ship abruptly turned and fired two shots at Løvendals Galei. Wessel quickly ordered his crew to raise the Dano-Norwegian ensign and fire three shots at the unknown ship, which had raised a Swedish ensign. The unknown ship, which was the 28-gun Swedish privateer Olbing Galley (purchased in England and captained by the Irishman Samuel Blackman) fired a broadside at Løvendals Galei, initiating a full-scale engagement.

At roughly 9:15pm, after over seven hours of combat, Olbing Galley raised her sails and attempted to flee, with Løvendals Galei in hot pursuit. By 10:30pm, the skirmish resumed, but ceased at 11:45pm due to nightfall. At 6:00am on 27 July, the two ships met again and another skirmish ensued until 9:30am. By now, both ships were severely damaged and running low on ammunition. Wessel sent an envoy to Olbing Galley, thanking her crew for a good duel and requesting more ammunition to continue the fight. His request was denied and Wessel and Blackman drank a toast to each other's health before parting.

When he heard about the incident, an infuriated Frederick IV of Denmark ordered the Admiralty to court-martial Wessel. In November 1714, Wessel stood trial, accused of disclosing vital military information (his lack of ammunition) to the enemy, as well as endangering a ship of the Crown by engaging a superior warship. Wessel defended himself vigorously and blamed his comrades, impressing Frederick IV; arguing that a section of the naval code mandated attacking fleeing enemy ships no matter their size, he was acquitted on 15 December. Wessel subsequently requested a promotion from the King and was made captain on 28 December.

=== Greatest exploits ===
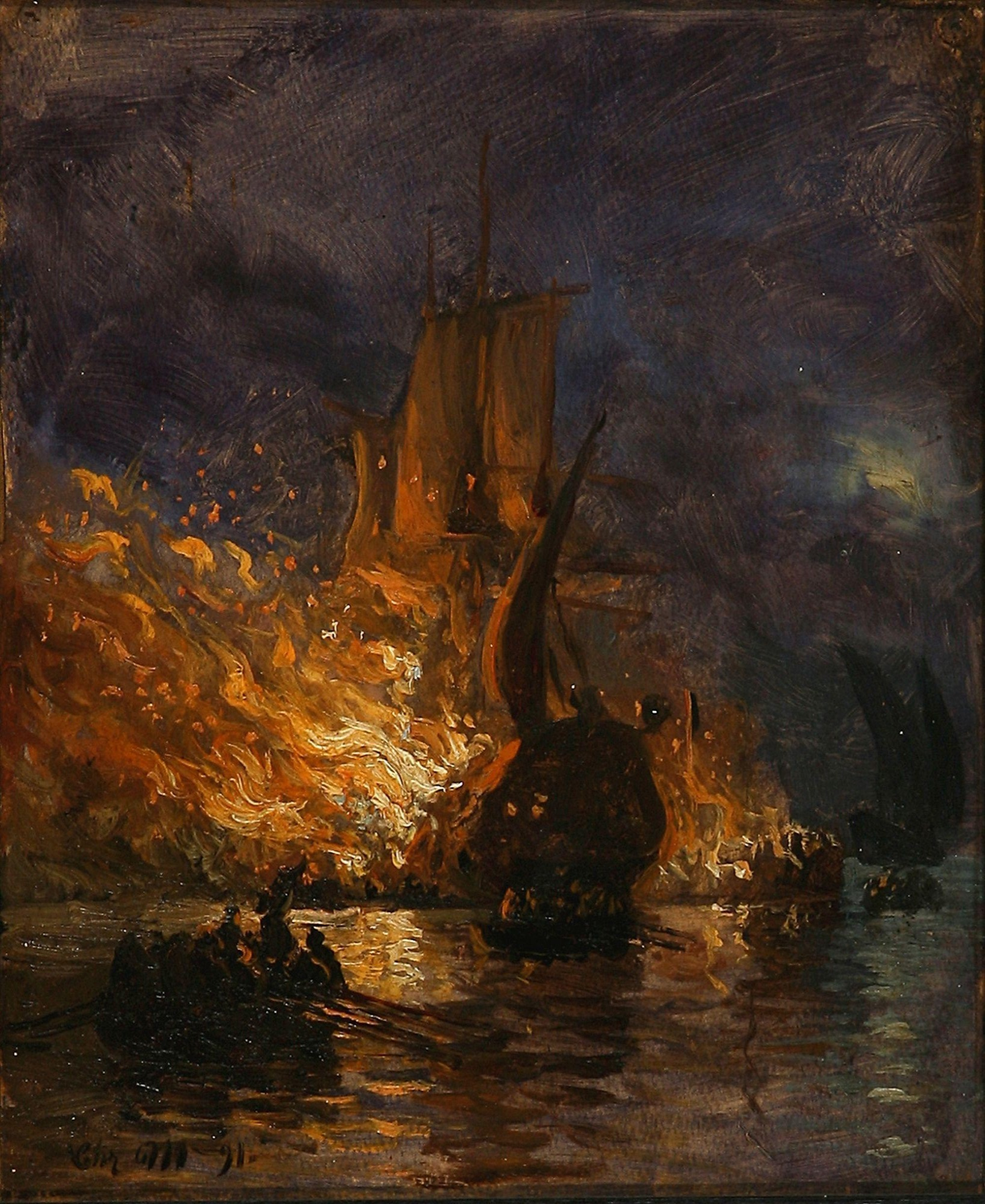
1891 painting by Mølsted of Tordenskjold's destruction of the Gothernburg Squadron in 1719

When, in 1715, the return of King Charles XII of Sweden from Turkey to Stralsund put new life into the dispirited Swedish forces, Wessel distinguished himself in numerous engagements off the coast of Swedish Pomerania, under the command of Admiral Christian Carl Gabel. He did the enemy considerable damage by cutting out their frigates and destroying their transports. During a battle at Kolberg on 24 April 1715, Wessel captured the Swedish Rear-Admiral Hans Wachtmeister, as well as the frigate Hvita Örn (White Eagle)—captained by Johan Casper Printz—which he was granted as his new flagship under the name Hvide Ørn. He then transferred to the main fleet under the command of Peter Raben.

On returning to Denmark at the beginning of 1716, he was ennobled by Frederick IV under the name of Tordenskiold. In 1716, Charles XII invaded Norway and laid siege to the fortress of Fredrikshald. Tordenskiold compelled Charles to raise the siege and retire to Sweden. Tordenskiold did so by pouncing upon the Swedish transport fleet, laden with ammunition and other military stores, which rode at anchor in the narrow and dangerous Dynekil Fjord. With two frigates and five smaller ships, he conquered or destroyed around 30 Swedish ships, with minor damage to his force during the Battle of Dynekilen on 8 July 1716.

For this, his greatest exploit, he was promoted to the rank of post-captain, commanding the Kattegat squadron – but at the same time incurred the enmity of Christian Carl Gabel, whom he had failed to take into his confidence. Tordenskiold's first important command was the squadron with which he was entrusted at the beginning of 1717 to destroy the Swedish Gothenburg Squadron, which interrupted the communications between Denmark and Norway. Owing to the disloyalty of certain of his officers who resented serving under the young adventurer, Tordenskjold failed to do all that was expected of him. His enemies were not slow to take advantage of his partial failure. The old charge of criminal recklessness was revived against him at a second court-martial before which he was summoned in 1718. Nevertheless, his old patron Ulrik Christian Gyldenløve intervened energetically on his behalf, and the charge was quashed.

In December 1718, Tordenskiold brought Frederick IV the welcome news of the death of Charles XII and was, in turn, made Rear-Admiral. Tordenskiold captured the Swedish fortress of Carlsten at Marstrand in 1719. The last feat of arms during the Great Northern War was Tordenskiold's partial destruction and partial capture of the Gothenburg Squadron, which had so long eluded him, on 26 September 1719. He was rewarded with the rank of vice-admiral.

=== Death ===
Tordenskiold did not long survive the termination of the war. On 12 November 1720, at the age of 30, he was killed in a duel by Livonian colonel Jakob Axel Staël von Holstein. During a trip to Hannover, Tordenskiold got in a fight with von Holstein, who had been in Swedish military service. The confrontation ended in a duel on the Sehlwiese in Gleidingen near Hildesheim, in which the sword of von Holstein ran through Tordenskiold. The circumstances around the death of Tordenskiold were set in a conspiratorial light, as summed up in the contemporary three-volume Tordenskiold biography (1747–1750) by C. P. Rothe.

The duel was encouraged by a dispute with von Holstein, whom Tordenskiold offended by labeling him as a cheat at gambling. At a dinner party, Tordenskiold told of a friend who had been cheated while gambling with a man who claimed to own a Hydra, to which von Holstein announced he was the owner of the said creature and took offence at being called a cheat. This dispute turned into a fight, in which von Holstein unsuccessfully tried to pull a sword, after which Tordenskiold used the pommel of his own sword to beat him up. von Holstein demanded satisfaction through a duel. The details of the duel – besides its ending with Tordenskiold's death by a single wound by von Holstein's sword – are not well known.

Tordenskiold's corpse was brought to Copenhagen to the Holmen Church without much ceremony, as duelling was not allowed according to Danish law. In 1819, he was buried in a sarcophagus.

== Legacy ==
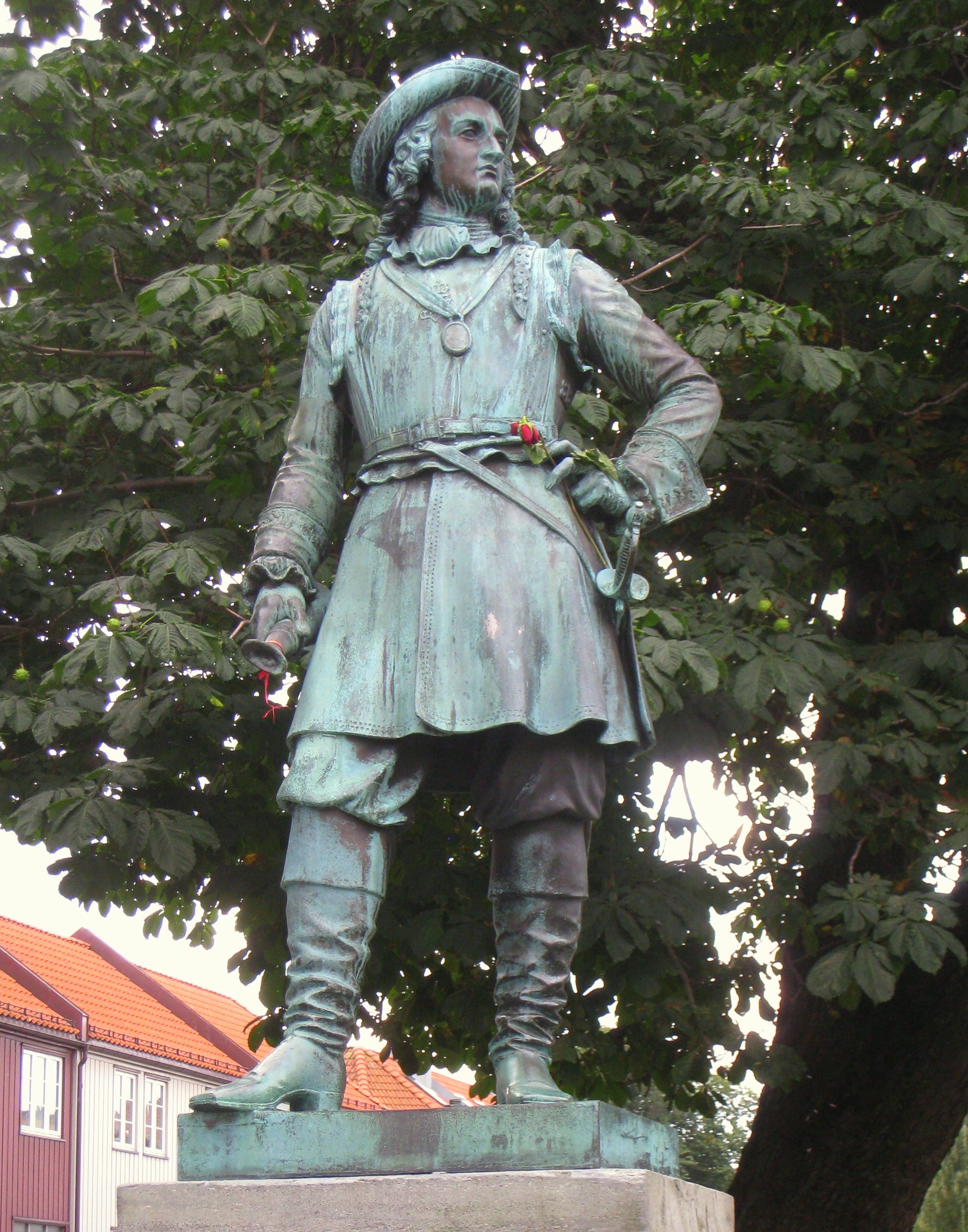
Statue of Tordenskjold in Trondheim

Tordenskiold remains a giant in Scandinavian culture and historiography. Considered the "Mozart of naval warfare" by many, Tordenskiold used psychological and amphibious warfare, tactics that far surpassed the rigid military doctrines of his era. His unpredictable coastal strikes accomplished what the main fleets could not: they paralysed Swedish logistics and broke their momentum. While Christen Thomesen Sehested's actions at Stralsund and Ulrich Christian Gyldenløve’s at Rügen were massive fleet and siege operations, Tordenskiold’s individual victories – notably Dynekilen and the capture of Marstrand – played a significant role in breaking Sweden's western front. Tordenskiold remains widely evaluated as the Great Northern War’s most strategically effective naval commander.

Outside of scholarship, Tordenskiold is mentioned by name both in the Danish national anthem "Kong Christian stod ved højen mast" from 1778 and the Norwegian national anthem "Ja, vi elsker dette landet" from 1864. Statues of him have been erected in Copenhagen (1876), Trondheim, Stavern, Oslo and Haakonsvern. In the United States, Tordenskjold Township in the state of Minnesota was settled in 1871 by Danish brothers who named it after him. The coat of arms of Holmestrand included his ship Hvide Ørn until the municipal merger in 2020, after which a new coat of arms was introduced.

The Royal Danish Navy has named several ships after him, including an early 20th century coastal defence ship. The Niels Juel class corvette Peter Tordenskiold, served from around 1980 to August 2009. The Royal Norwegian Navy has also named ships after him, such as the coastal defence ship Tordenskjold, and the Royal Norwegian Naval Training Establishment in Bergen is named KNM Tordenskjold.

The Danish city of Frederikshavn has hosted an annual summer festival in his memory since 1998. Tordenskiold was stationed there and wrote 67 letters from there between 1717 and 1719. In 2008, the Festival attracted more than 30,000 visitors. In 2009, the Days of Tordenskiold were celebrated on 26, 27, and 28 June.

Several Danish and Norwegian cities have streets named Tordenskjoldsgade (Tordenskjold Street) after him.

The most popular brand of matches in Denmark is called Tordenskjold. In the late 1800s, Sweden had a large export production of matches, so a Danish manufacturer put Tordenskiold's portrait on his matchbox in 1882, in the hope he could once more strike at the Swedish (Danish: give de svenske stryg). The Tordenskjold brand was bought by a Swedish company in 1972.

=== In fiction ===
He eventually attained mythic status as one of the most successful Dano-Norwegian military commanders. As the Danish-Norwegian Union ended in 1814 with the Treaty of Kiel and Denmark consigned itself to the status of a minor power following the Napoleonic Wars, Tordenskiold was revived as both a Danish and Norwegian national symbol. He was portrayed as the little guy outsmarting his far more powerful adversaries, and his exploits were enhanced by mixing in myths and fiction.

A comprehensive fictionalized account was collected in the 1858 popular song "Jeg vil sjunge om en Helt", and a great number of fictional plays and novels were subsequently published. These accounts served as background for the 1910 Danish film "Peter Tordenskjold", based on a Carit Etlar play, and the 1942 film "Tordenskjold går i land". In 1993, the two-act musical Tordenskjold opened, a mix of fact and fiction, with Øystein Wiik as Peter Wessel. The musical was performed in Gladsaxe and Aarhus. The 2016 film "Satisfaction 1720" is another mix of fact, fiction, and speculation about Tordenskjold after the Great Northern War and the duel that ended his life.

One of the myths about Tordenskjold has entered the Danish and Norwegian languages. During the negotiations for Marstrand's surrender in 1719, it is told that Tordenskjold's men moved from block to block as he walked the Marstrand commander through his positions, thus convincing the commander that his strength was much greater than it was. This gave birth to the idiom "Tordenskjold's soldiers" (Danish: Tordenskjolds soldater), denoting the same group of people (feeling compelled to) repeatedly taking charge and fill multiple roles.

== See also ==
- Tordenskiold
- Tordenskiold Oak
- Danish nobility
- Norwegian nobility
