= Grote or Andreaskerk (Hattem) =

Church in Hattem, Netherlands

St. Andrews church of Hattem
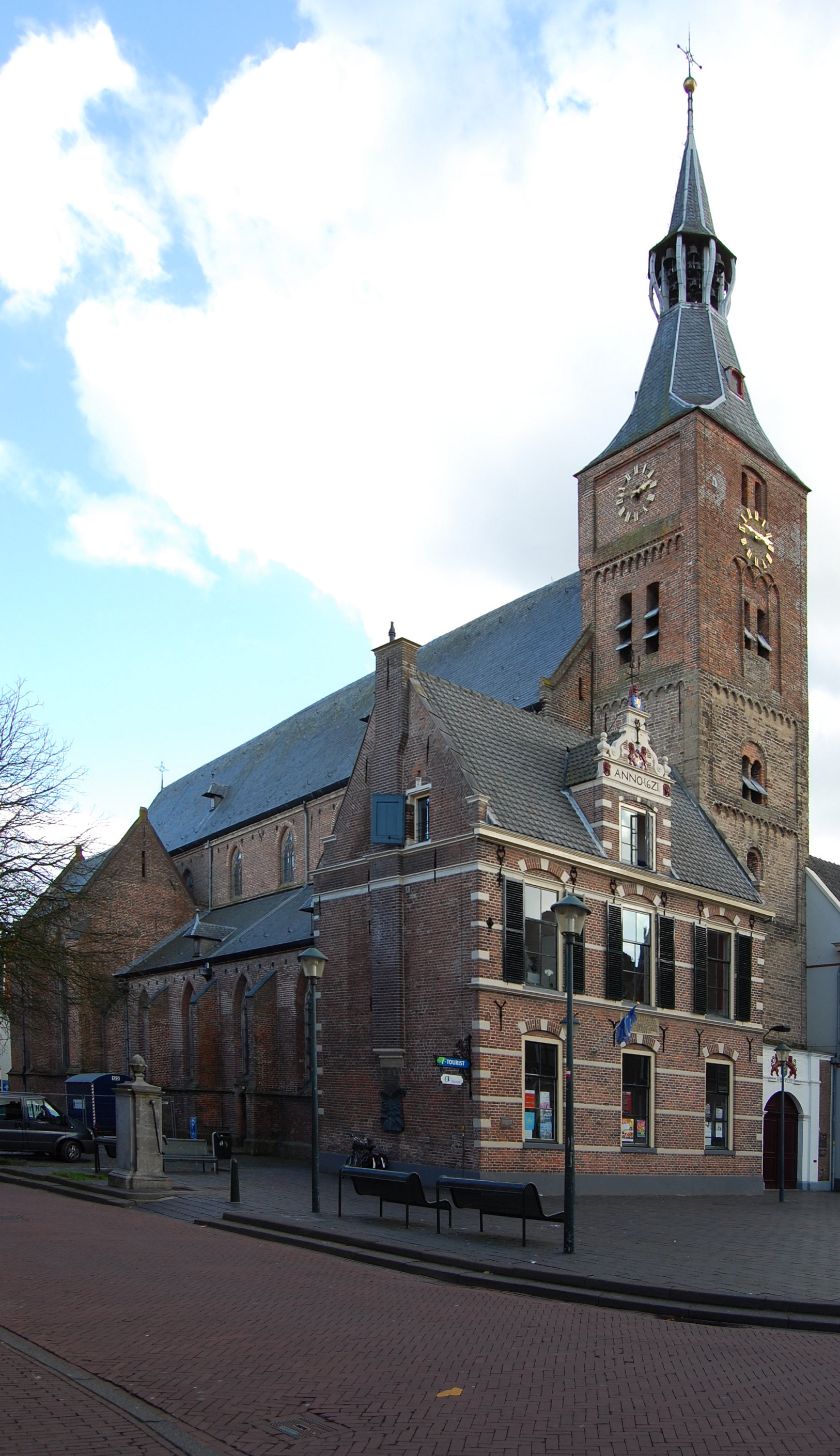
- The church in 2010

Religion
- Affiliation: Protestant
- Year consecrated: 1176

Location
- Location: Netherlands
- Interactive map of St. Andrews church of Hattem
- Coordinates: 52°28′27.7″N 6°4′11.7″E

Architecture
- Style: Romanesque and Gothic
- Completed: 1176 - 1504

Website
- Official website (in Dutch)

The Grote Kerk or Andreaskerk (The Great Church or St. Andrew) is the oldest church building of Hattem. It is situated in the city centre. It is used by the Reformed Protestant community of Hattem for holding church services. Organ concerts and other musical events are also organised in the building.

== History ==
=== Romanesque Church ===
The forerunner of the present building was built around the year 1225. This was a Romanesque church building, of which only the tower is a visible figure today. However, other traces are still present: the roof surfaces of the Romanesque church roof are still visible on the rear wall, that is the east wall of the tower. In addition, the baptismal font is an important inventory item from the first church that has been preserved.

=== Gothic Church ===
Due to the expansion of the city of Hattem, which had meanwhile obtained city rights in 1299, the Andreaskerk became too small. Although the Plague had become epidemic in Western Europe, the population of the city increased to such an extent that a plan for a new church had become necessary. In the first quarter of the fifteenth century, a completely new, Gothic church was built. The Gothic choir was completed in 1407: it was consecrated by the suffragan bishop of Utrecht on October 27, 1407. Since this date it is also known which patron saints the church was assigned to protect, namely: Andrew the Apostle and St. Catherine of Alexandria. The Gothic nave was completed around 1420 – 1425.

The origin of the design can be found in various church buildings in the area. Although the main churches in Zwolle and Deventer and on a smaller scale in Hasselt and Vollenhove were built as spacious hall churches, the smaller towns in the northern Veluwe such as Harderwijk, Elburg and Hattem opted for the basilical construction, analogous to the designs of St. Martin's Cathedral in Utrecht and the Bovenkerk in Kampen. In Hattem a pure basilical form was chosen. The wall structure of the nave is characterized by a simplified form of the classical Gothic style, while retaining the characteristic three-part wall structure: a first arcade zone, with openings between the pillars towards the side aisles, a second zone, also called the triforium, with a series of niches and a third window zone, also called the clerestory. This created a three-aisled nave: a high nave surrounded by lower aisles on the north and south sides. Simultaneously with the completion of the nave, an organ was most likely also installed. Architectural research in 1973 showed that the structure on which the 16th-century organ is now located was built in 1423. The gallery of the early 15th-century organ still exists. In 1429 the church was struck by lightning, which resulted in a fire. Altars were rededicated on June 11, 1436, once the restoration and repair work was completed.

Construction was provisionally completed in 1436, but expansion plans were already underway at that time, which were completed in 1504. From 1407, the old choir was replaced by a new choir, and chapels were built on both sides of the now extended nave. The Annakapel (Chapel of St. Anne) was built around 1504 on the northern side and the Mariakapel (Chapel of St. Mary) on the southern side was completed around 1440. As a seal between the new choir and the nave, a choir screen was erected in 1646, which included a pulpit from 1635, which most likely first sat on the nave side of a southern nave column. These changes took place when the city, its inhabitants, and thus its church all adhered to the new doctrine, the Protestant faith. Various magistrate 's chairs were also placed in 1646. Space was created for this because the side altars were demolished during the Reformation. These housed the magistrates of the city and their families, such as the mayor, the aldermen and other notables. These seats are still present in the church, along with many other authentic pews that housed noble families and other distinguished citizens. During the last interior restoration from 1986 – 1995, all this furniture was thoroughly restored. The paintings, the existence of which had been known since 1900, mostly consisting of fantasy flowers, rushes and rosettes, were also restored to their former glory.

== Font ==
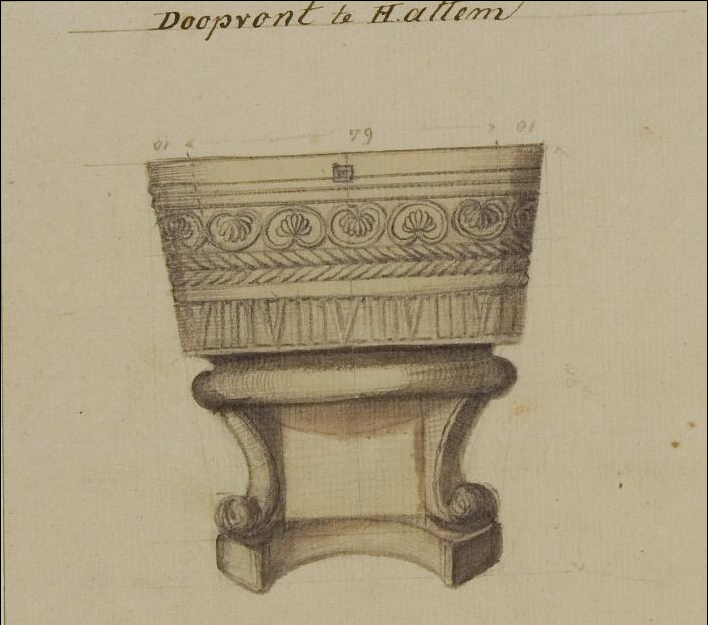
Baptismal font, dating from the 13th century. Fragment of a drawing by an anonymous artist (Gelders Archief, Arnhem)

The baptismal font from the first Romanesque church and thus dating from the 13th century has been preserved. The baptismal font, hewn from one piece of Bentheimer sandstone, is still in use. Although it stayed outside the church for a period, when it probably stood in a city park, it was given a place in the church again around 1900 through the efforts of the then city archivist FA Hoefer. Initially it was placed in the choir, but in 1959 the font was placed in front of the pulpit, so that it also regained its original function. In that period a copper inlay baptismal font was made by Mr FP van Tiel living in Hattem, a coppersmith by profession.

The appearance of the baptismal font, decorated all around with grapevines, refers to the meaning of baptism by its analogy with the Gospel of John, chapter 15:1-8: "I am the Vine, thou art the branches".

== Organs ==
There are two organs in the church.

=== Slegel organ ===
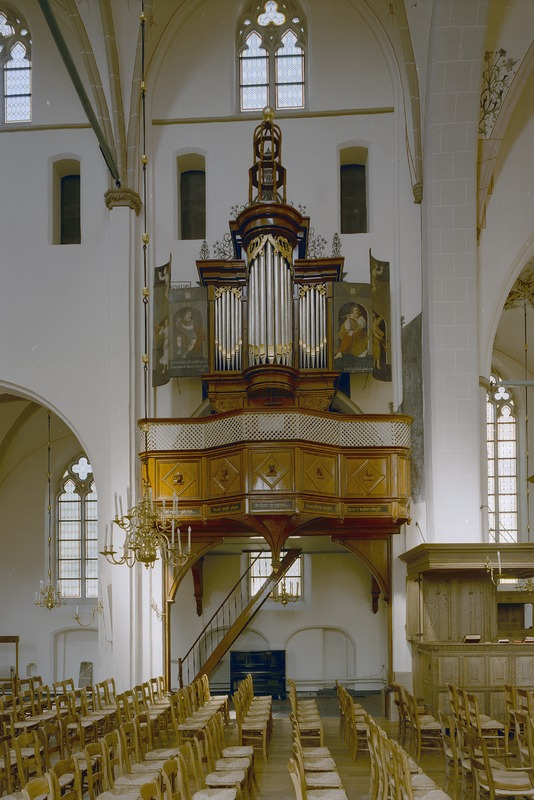
The Slegel organ (Slegelorgel)

The oldest instrument originated in the middle of the 16th century, after which it was modified and expanded in the 17th century. The organ is known to have been built by Jan Slegel and completed in 1677 . The older pipe organ has been changed and expanded over the years. In 1974, the Flentrop company carried out a complete restoration, striving for the situation as it had arisen in 1677. Characteristic of the organ are the 16th-century carvings and the shutters with paintings from 1662 and 1667. The organ, with meantone temperament, is still used to accompany congregational singing.

=== Flentrop organ ===
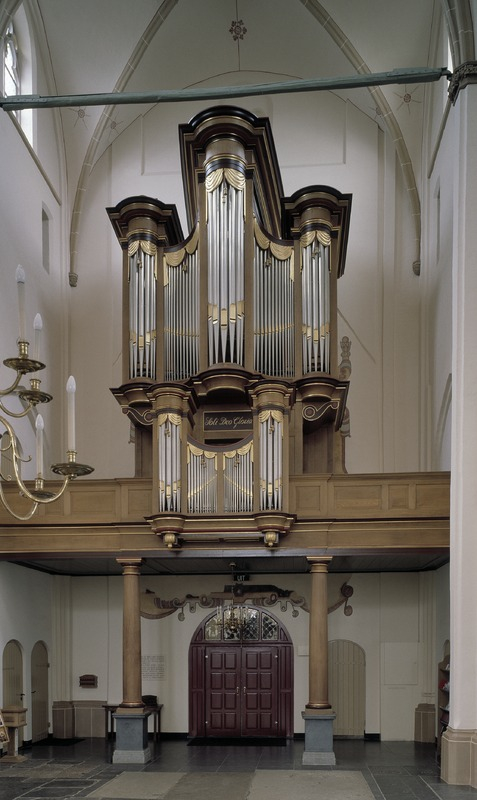
The Flentrop organ

The second organ, also called the large organ, was installed after a number of predecessors, because the above-mentioned organ was considered too small for accompanying congregational singing. The main working case was originally built in 1855 for an organ in a church in Waterloo, Belgium by François-Bernard Loret. In 1974 the empty greenhouse was purchased and a balcony was designed. During the aforementioned interior restoration, the organ was cleaned and waxed. The austere organ was also decorated by applying gold leaf accents. This organ was installed by Flentrop, who also supplied the pipe work.

== Tower ==
The lower part of church tower has a brick core with a tuff cladding on the outside. It is suspected that the tower was built at a late stage in the Romanesque period. This is justified by the Lombard bands up to the third section of the tower. The tower was also completed when the Romanesque church was built, about 1225. The base of the tower measures 5.45 by 6.03 meters. Because the ridge of the Gothic nave was 24 meters above ground level when it was completed, the tower was also raised. The Romanesque part is measured in relation to ground level, 16.50 meters high. The elevation consisted of a brick construction of approximately 8 meters. The old gable roof of the Romanesque tower was placed on top of the tower body, which was replaced in 1611 by the current spire.

== Photo gallery. ==
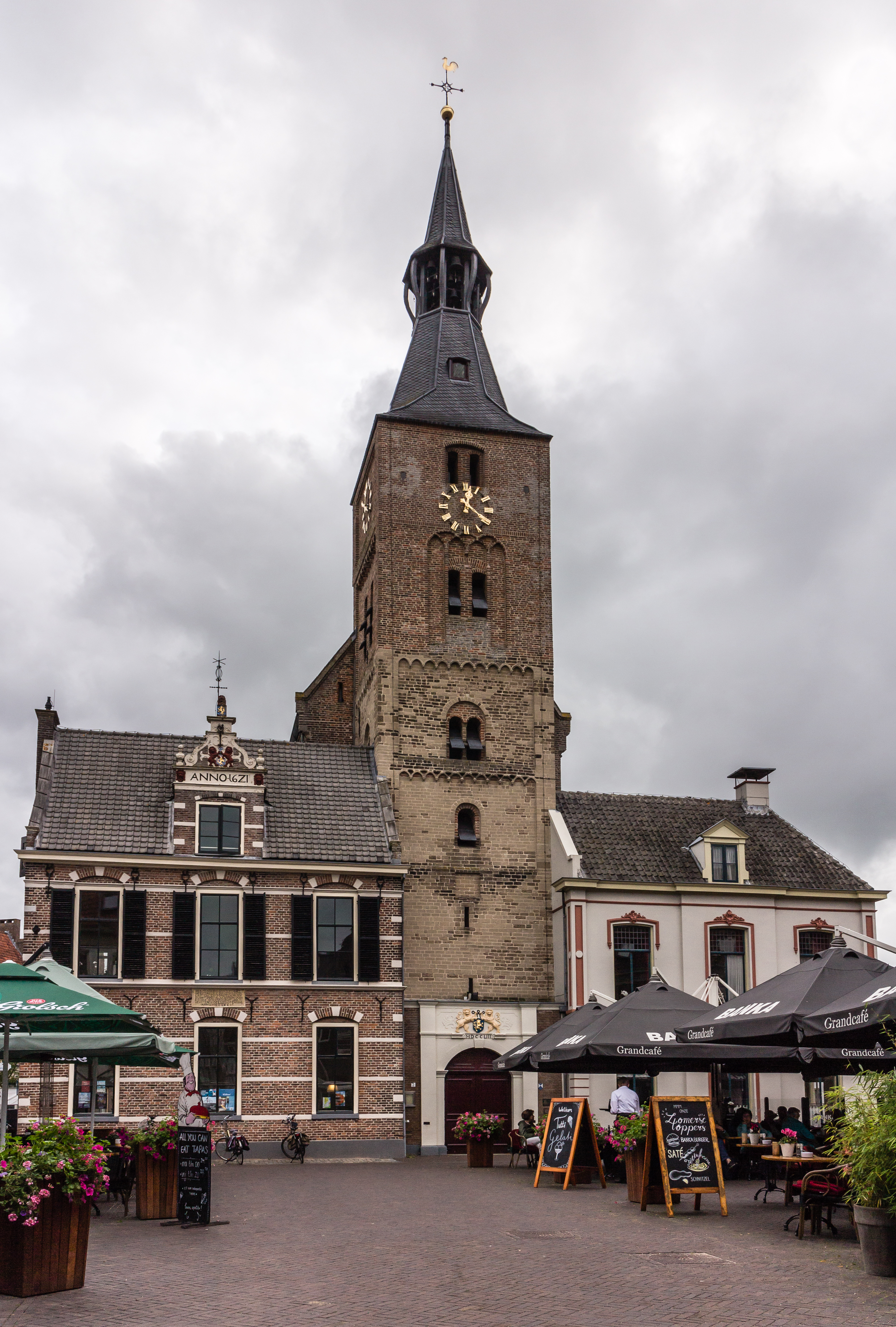
Front of the tower.

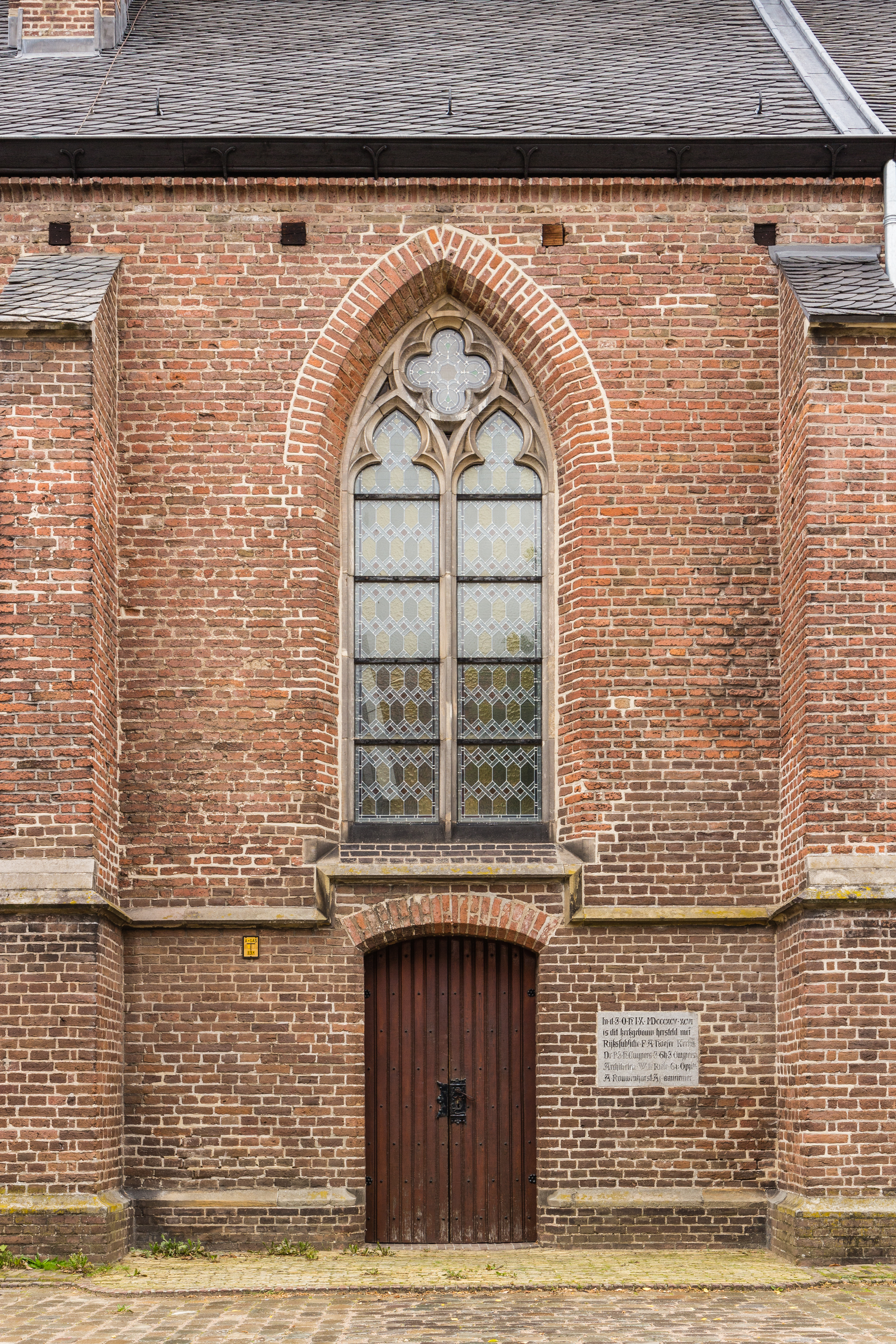
Side entrance of the church.

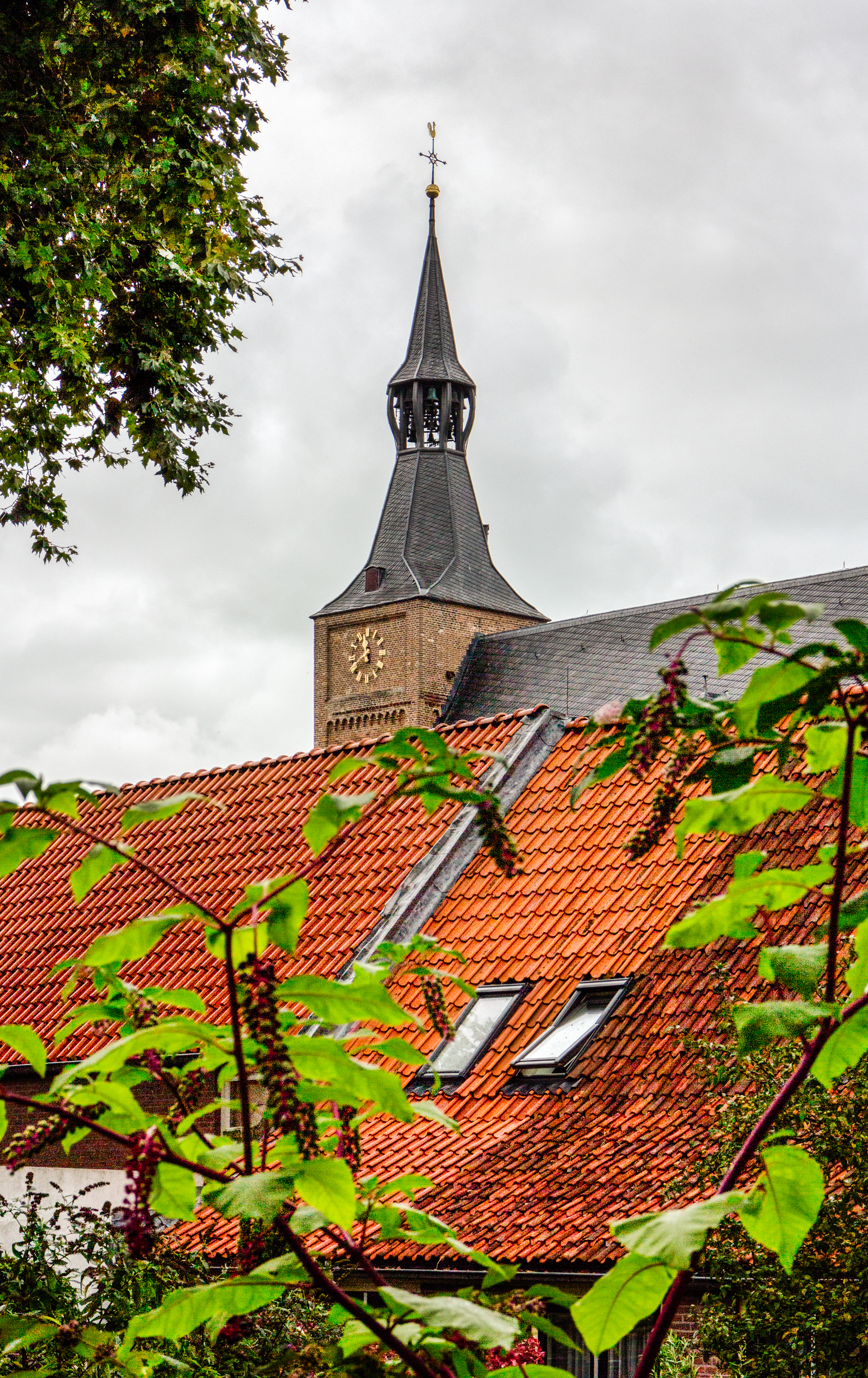
View of the tower from Het Hooge Huis.

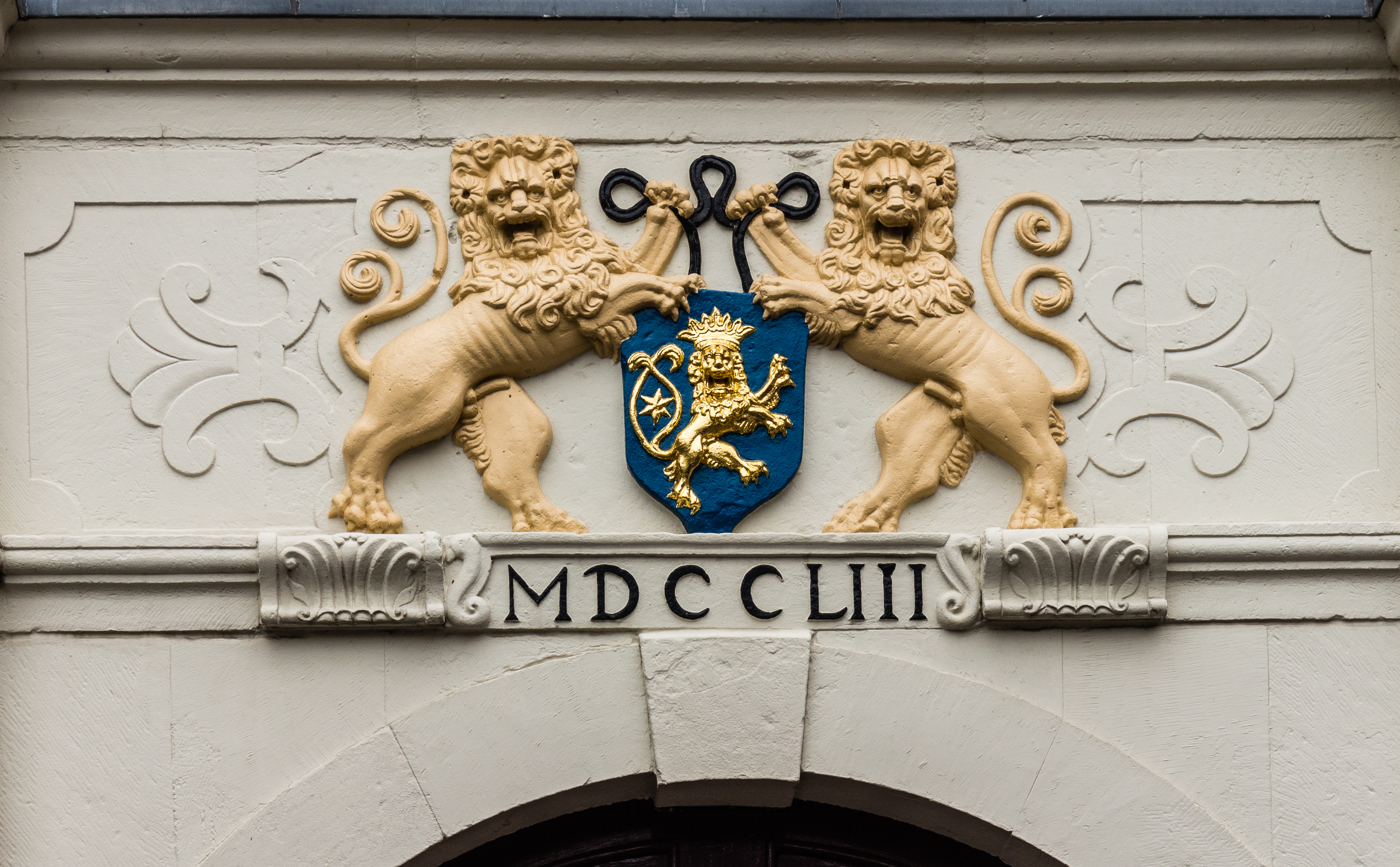
Sculpture above the main entrance to the church.
