= Winter Landscape with Skaters =

Painting by Hendrick Avercamp

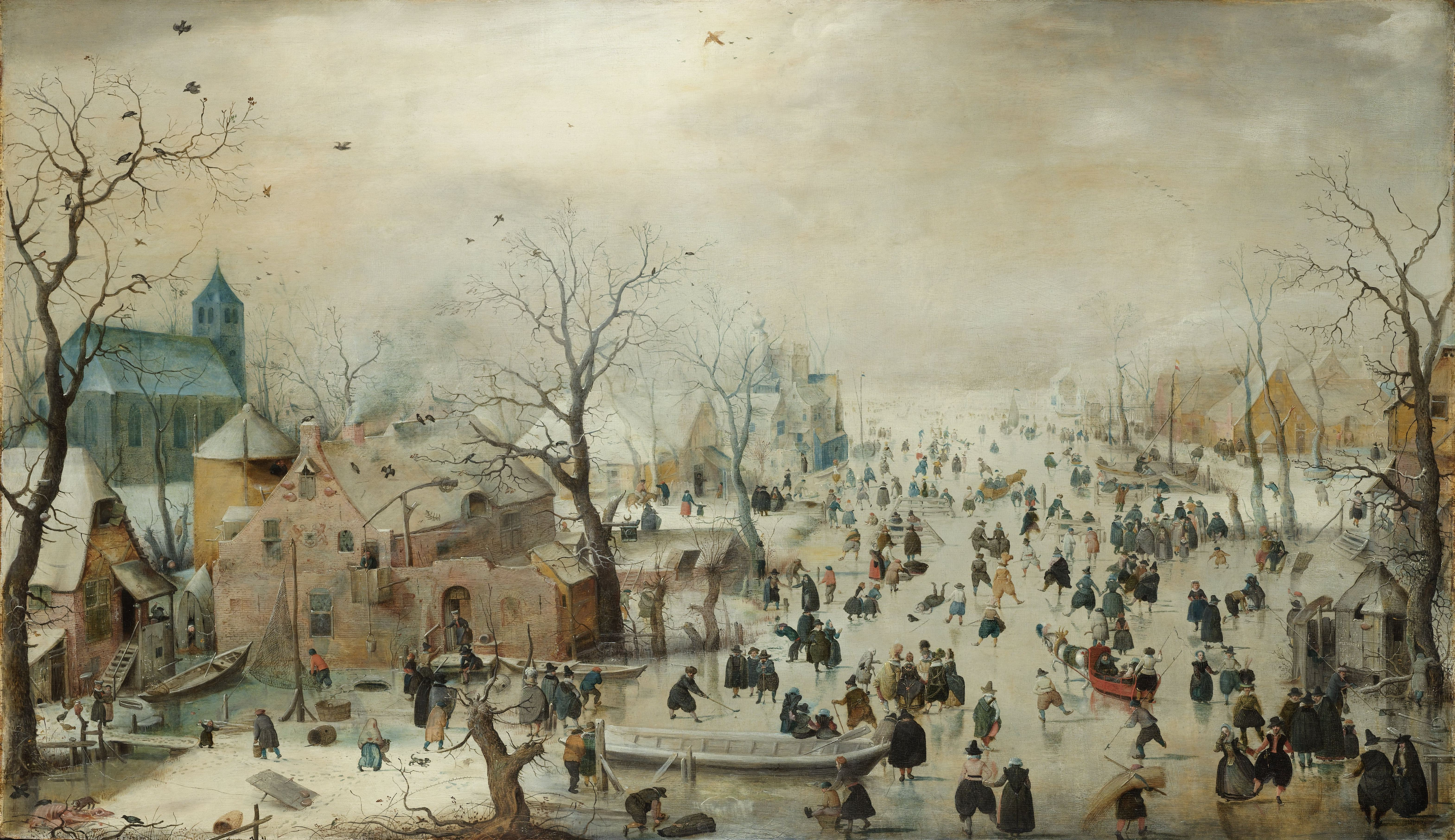
- Artist: Hendrick Avercamp
- Year: c.1608
- Medium: Oil on oak
- Dimensions: 77.3 cm × 131.9 cm (30.4 in × 51.9 in)
- Location: Rijksmuseum, Amsterdam

Winter Landscape with Skaters is a c.1608 oil-on-oak painting by the Dutch artist Hendrick Avercamp in the collection of the Rijksmuseum in Amsterdam.

This painting shows ice skaters of all sorts enjoying a day on a frozen river. People dressed up stand among villagers going about their daily chores. A dog chews on a dead carcass in the lower left corner. A boat sails away on a sled in the background as a group of fishermen make efforts to free a frozen sailboat in the foreground. A bird trap is seen to the left among other farm implements and the whole scene is overshadowed by a church to the left.

Winter Landscape with Skaters is considered one of Avercamp's earliest works, and is painted in a style strongly reminiscent of Pieter Bruegel the Elder's 1565 painting Winter Landscape with Ice skaters and Bird trap. Some aspects of this picture are taken directly from Bruegel's works, such as the wooden "bird trap" which also appears in other works by Avercamp. This painting also shows three ceramic bird traps fixed to the gable of the house. Avercamp was influenced in his subject by the Little Ice Age, particularly the cold winter of 1607–08, and was the first of the Dutch painters to specialise in snow scenes.

The painting is signed at the lower right in the form of graffiti caulked on the fisherman's hut in the foreground.

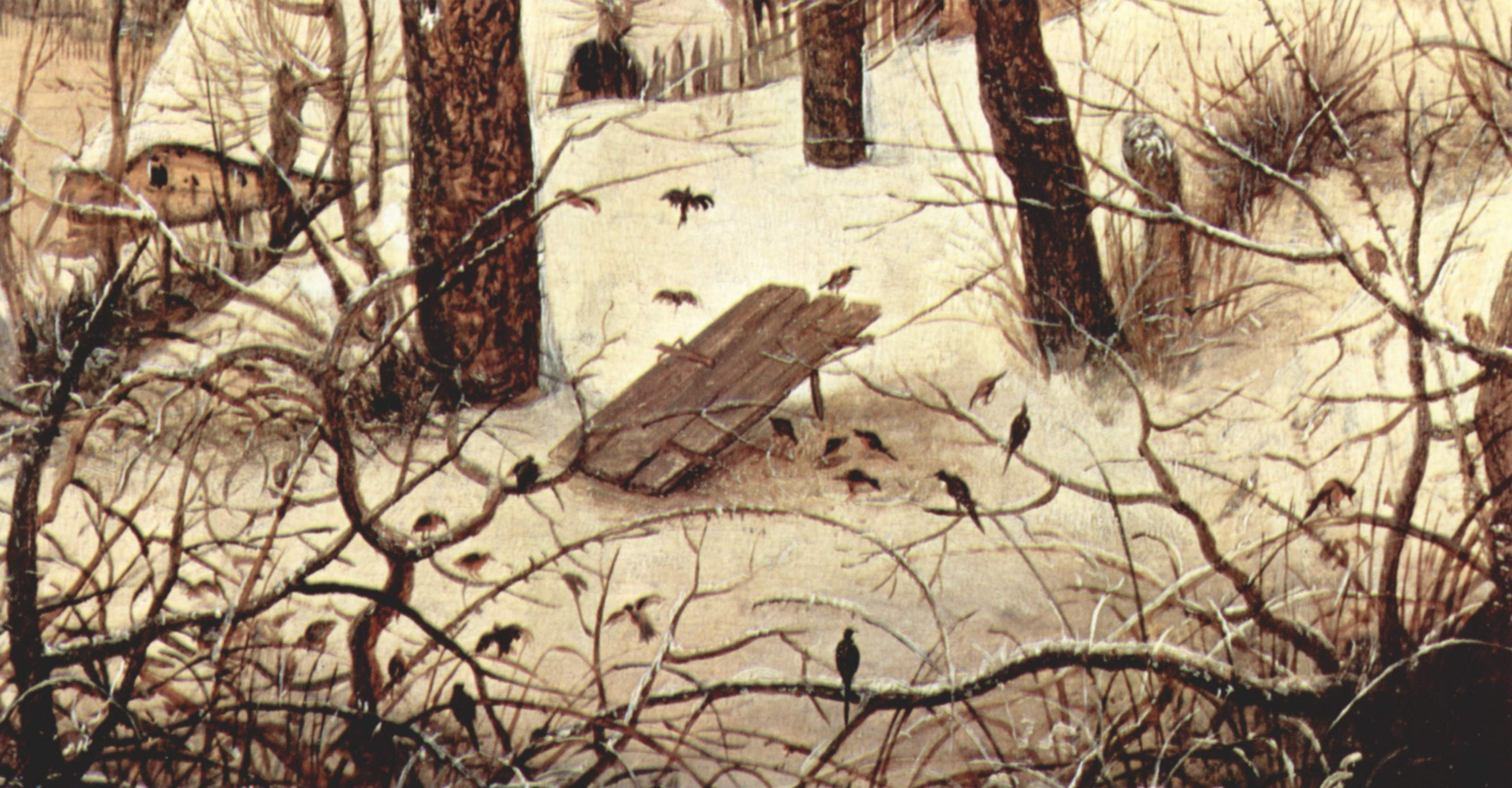
Detail of Bruegel's Winter Landscape with Ice skaters and Bird trap, Kunsthistorisch Museum

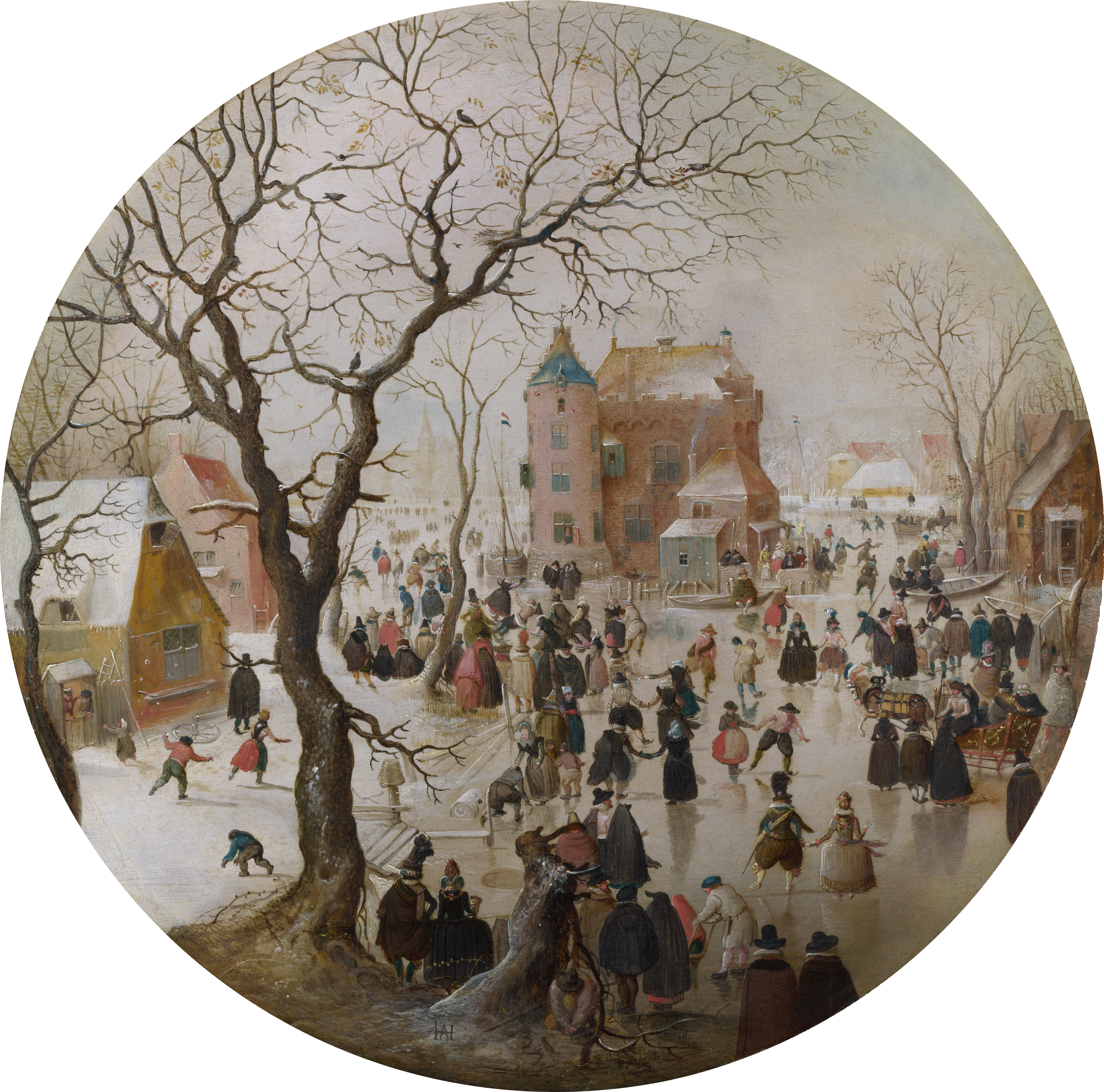
Avercamp, A Winter Scene with Skaters near a Castle, 1608–09, National Gallery, London

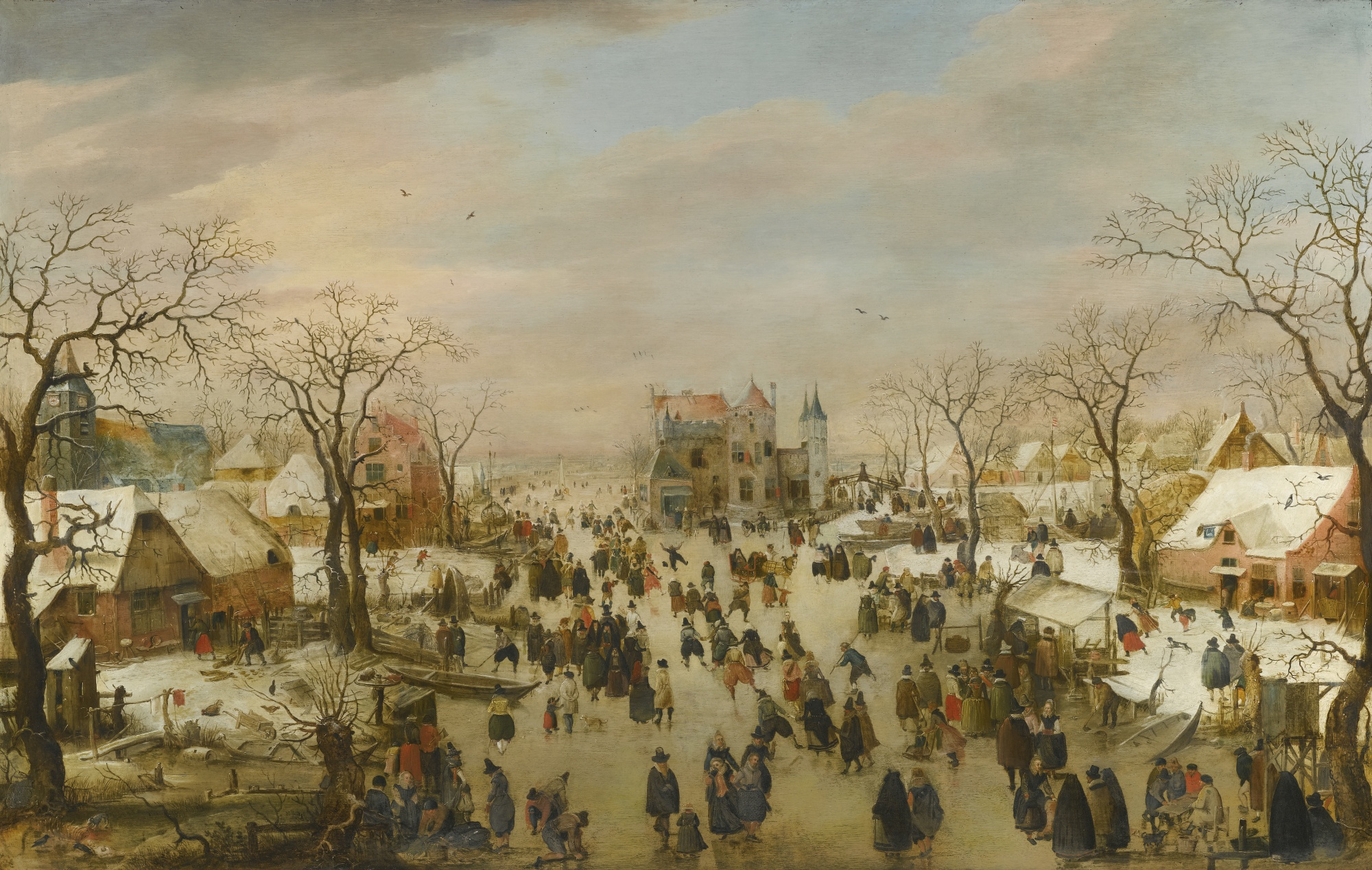
Winter landscape by Avercamp with a dog chewing a dead carcass and a bird trap, c. 1610

The painting was acquired by the Rijksmuseum in 1897, with assistance from the Vereniging Rembrandt. It has appeared as a collection highlight in museum catalogs ever since.
