= Hattem =

- Municipality and city
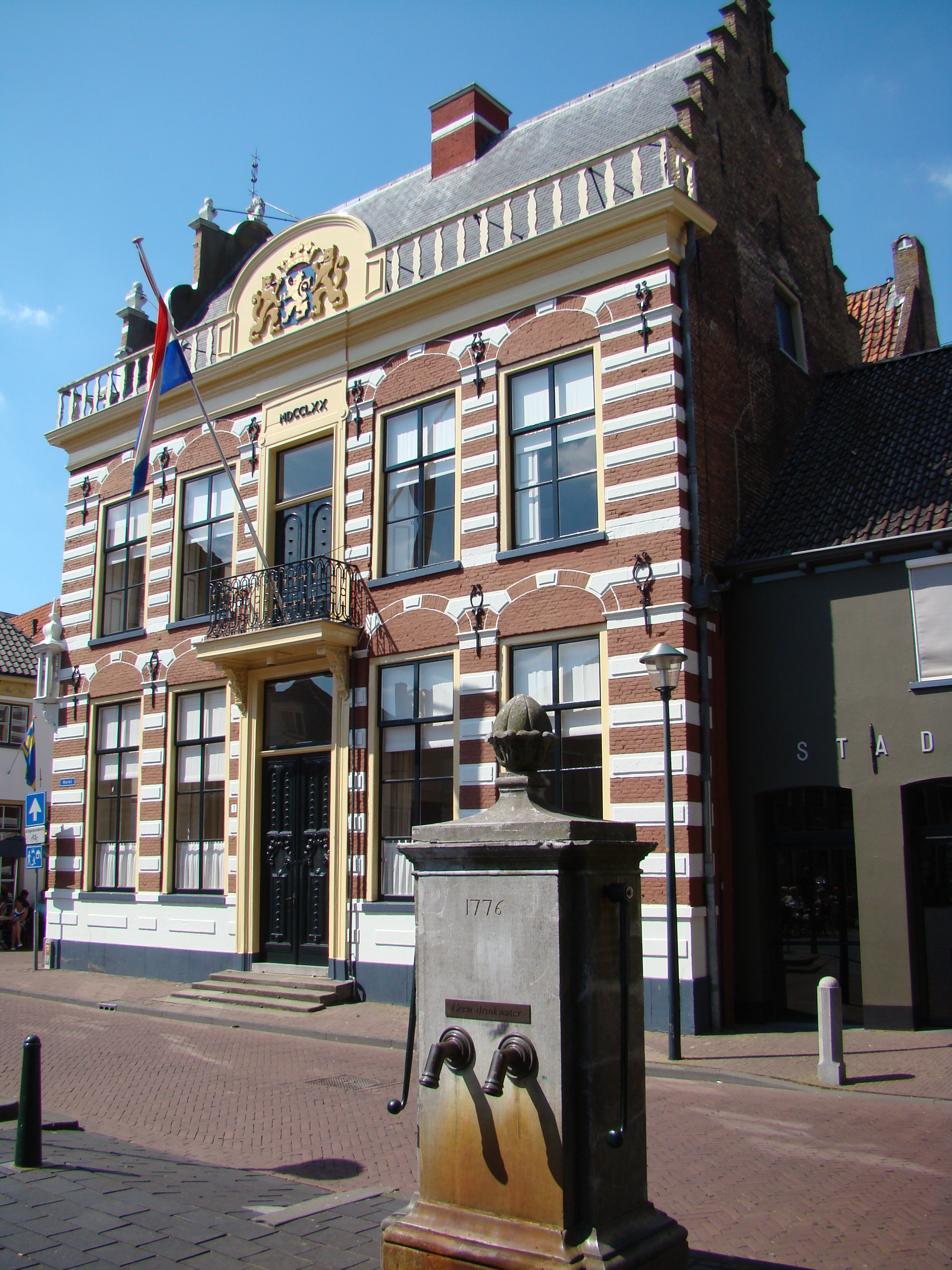
- Hattem city hall

- Flag Coat of arms

- Location in Gelderland
- Coordinates: 52°28′N 6°4′E
- Country: Netherlands
- Province: Gelderland

Government
  - Body: Municipal council
  - Mayor: Marleen Sanderse (CDA)

Area
  - Total: 24.16 km^{2} (9.33 sq mi)
  - Land: 23.08 km^{2} (8.91 sq mi)
  - Water: 1.08 km^{2} (0.42 sq mi)
- Elevation: 5 m (16 ft)

Population (2023)
  - Total: 12,569
  - Density: 545/km^{2} (1,410/sq mi)
- Demonym: Hattemer
- Time zone: UTC+1 (CET)
  - Summer (DST): UTC+2 (CEST)
- Postcode: 8050–8052
- Area code: 038

Hattem (Dutch pronunciation: [ˈɦɑtəm]) is a municipality and a city in the eastern Netherlands. The municipality had a population of 12,228 in 2021. The municipality includes the hamlet of 't Zand.

== Name origin ==
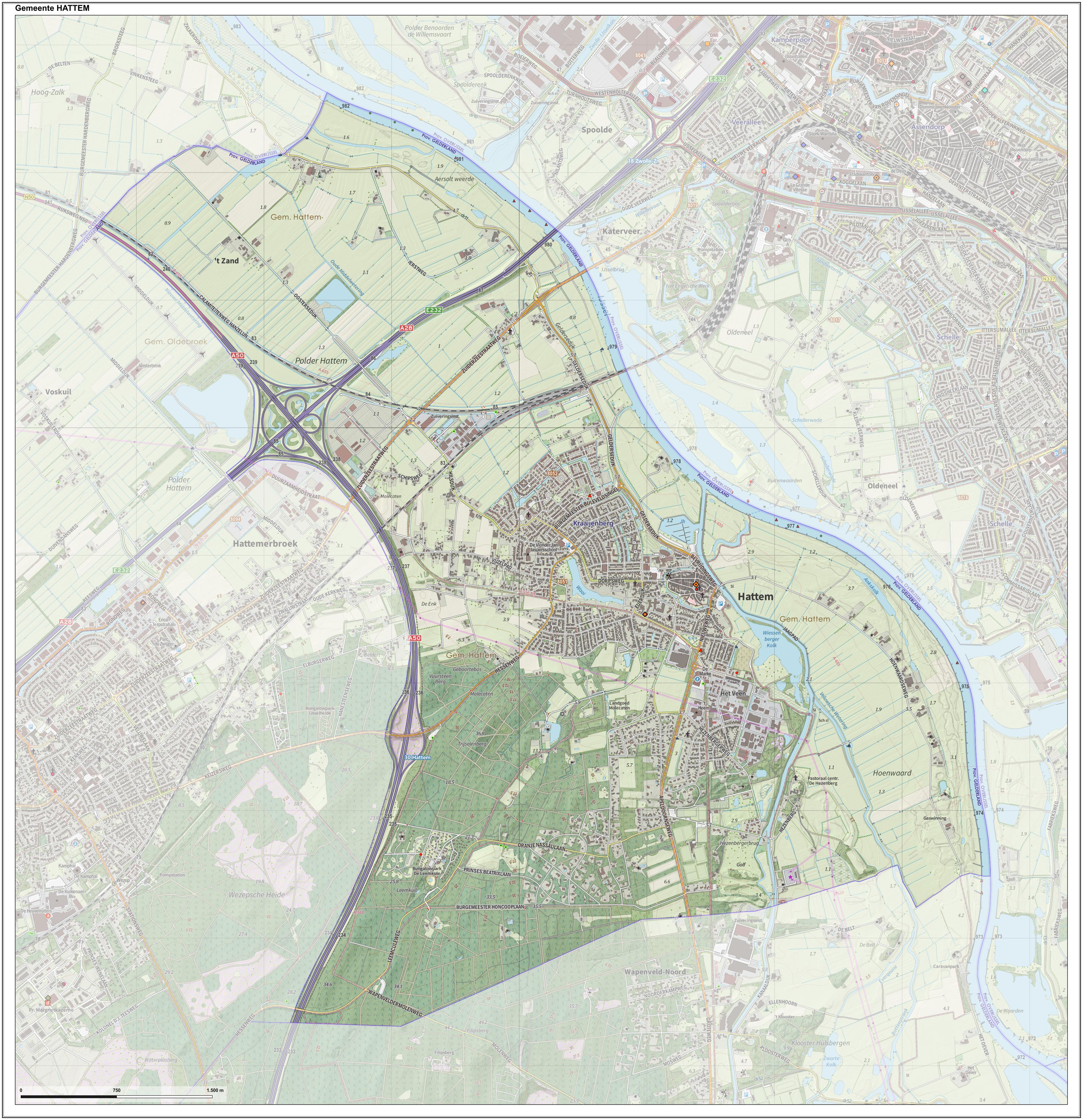
Dutch topographic map of Hattem, June 2015

The name "Hattem" is a typical farmyard name. The exact origin of "Hattem" is yet unclear. In general two explanation exist. Hattem would be the 'heem' (home) of a people who belong to the tribe of Chattuarii (or Hattuarii or Hatten). A second origin could refer to the leader of a people under the leader Hatto. This fits with the fact that a lot of farmyard names are deduced from persons' names.

== History ==
A document referring to Hattem is found is dated around 800. This document is the Codex Laureshamensis, in which the settlement Hattem is mentioned because two farmhouses in this place are donated to the Lorsch abbey.

=== Established as parish ===
Despite this early statement, no church or chapel was built in Hattem. In 1176 Hattem became a parish ('kerspel'). The chapel, measuring 17.5 by 9.5 meters, was not built at the current city centre, but at the Gaedsberg ('Gods-mountain'). The borders of the parish coincide with the latter borders of the jurisdiction Hattem. Hattem obtained city rights in 1299 from the landgrave Reinoud I van Gelre. In the decades before a fortified town is founded at the northern border of the Veluwe. The city plan lies around the current church. The tower of this church is dated to the 12th century which indicates that, beside the parish church at the Gaedsberg, a chapel was present at the current city centre of Hattem. With obtaining town privileges, both the religious and the legal centre were moved. The new church and the city are dedicated to the apostle Andreas.

Hattem was a member of the Hanseatic League, one of nine Dutch cities. It joined shortly after 1294 and presumably played a very minor role. The last mention of connection to the Hansa was in 1615.

=== Later history ===
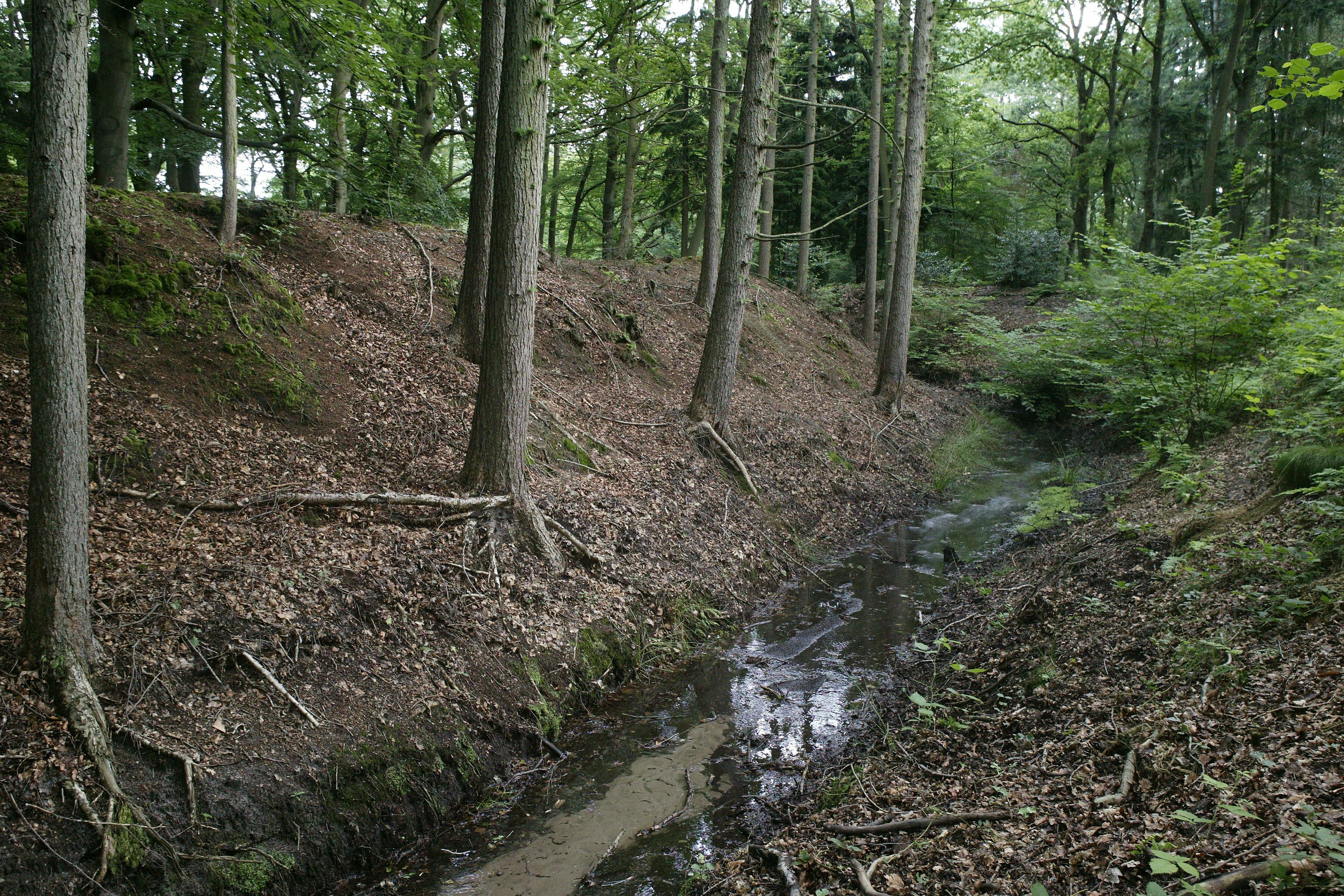
View of the 'Spanish Trenches', ramp work from the Eighty Years' War

In 1401, duke William of Guelders donated the Hoenwaard to the citizens of Hattem, in order to feed their cattle and to manufacture bricks for their houses. In 1404 the castle St. Lucia was built, which became known as the "Dikke Tinne" (the fat merlon). The reason can be found in the thick castle walls, at that time the thickest walls found in the Netherlands. In 1778, the castle was torn down in order to use the bricks to build houses. In 1786, both Hattem and Elburg became known as centres of the Patriottentijd, a political faction. These movements, however, were successfully suppressed by stadtholder William V.

== Other information ==
Hattem had a railway station from 21 November 1887 until 8 October 1950.

The current mayor of Hattem is Marleen Sanderse (CDA).

Hattem, bordering the forests of 'De Veluwe' and along the IJssel river has the following to offer: terraces, museums, a variety of shops and annually returning events. Hattem celebrates De dikke tinne festival every two years in a medieval atmosphere.

== Notable residents ==
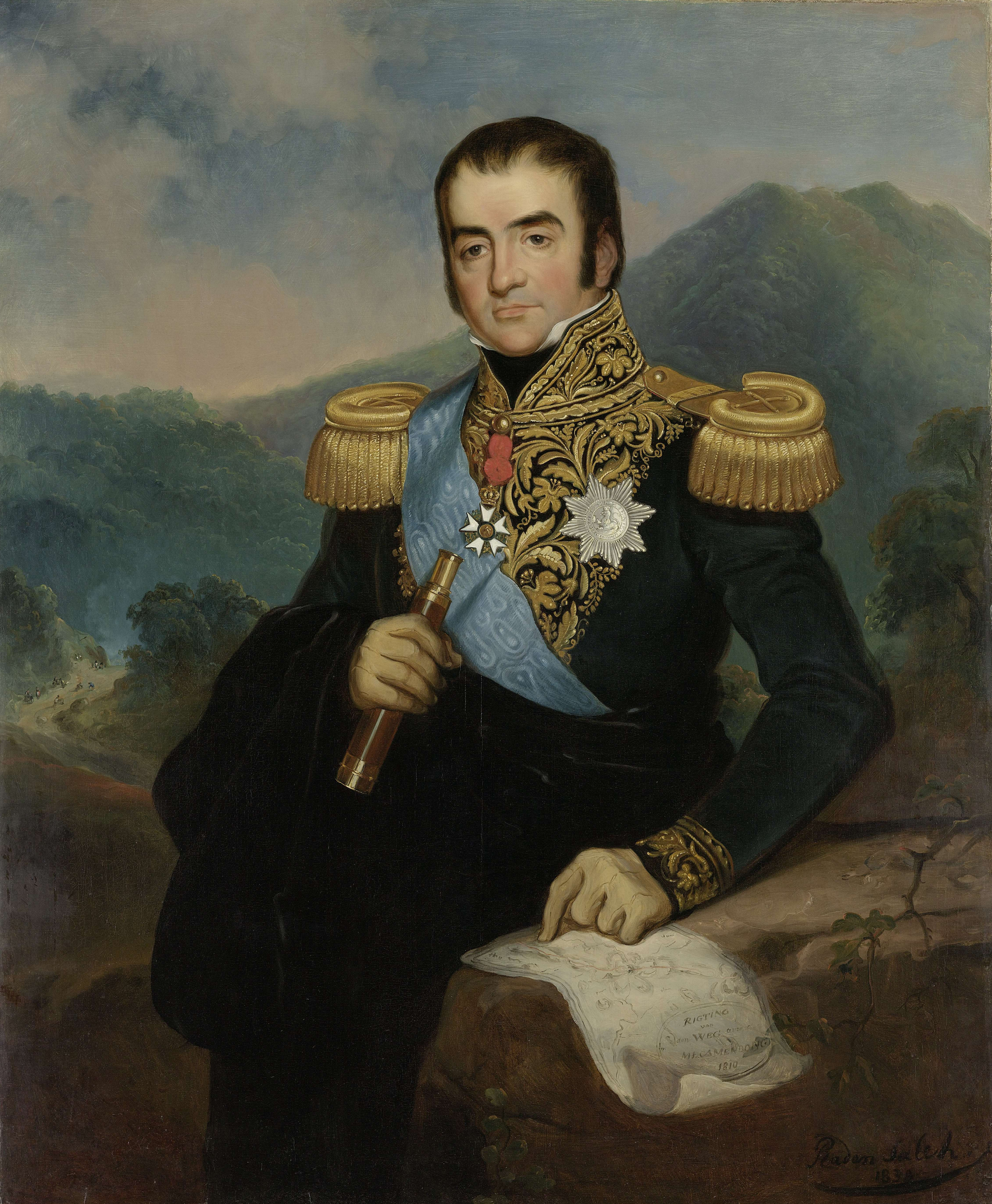
Posthumous portrait of Herman Willem Daendels

- John III of Egmont (1438–1516), first Count of Egmont and Stadtholder of Holland, Zeeland and West-Friesland
- Herman Willem Daendels (1762–1818), Dutch politician, 36th Governor-General of the Dutch East Indies, 1808 to 1811
- Jan Voerman (1857–1941), a Dutch painter
- Luite Klaver (1870–1960), a Dutch painter, lithographer and inventor
- Willem Jacob van Stockum (1910–1944), a mathematician, contributed to general relativity
- Henri Wassenbergh (1924–2014), a Dutch academic, professor of law, and writer
- Robert Long (1943–2006), a Dutch singer and television presenter
- Ellen Spijkstra (born 1957), Dutch ceramic artist and photographer

=== Sport ===
- Jan van Raalte (born 1968), a football manager and former professional player with 324 club caps
- Ellen Kuipers (born 1971), a former field hockey forward, team bronze medallist at the 1996 Summer Olympics

== Sightseeing ==
- Anton Pieck Museum
- Voerman Museum Hattem
- Bakkerij museum
- Dijkpoort town gate
- windmill De Fortuin
- Grote or Andreaskerk main church

== Gallery ==
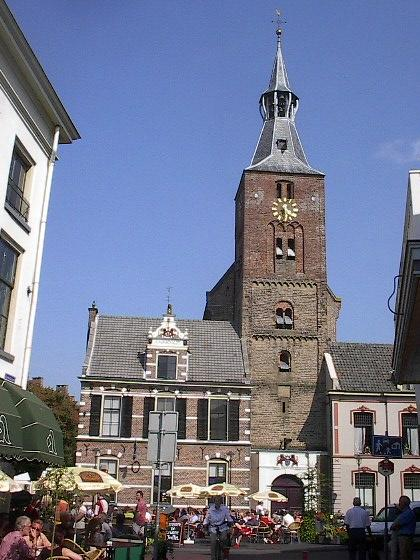
Church of Hattem

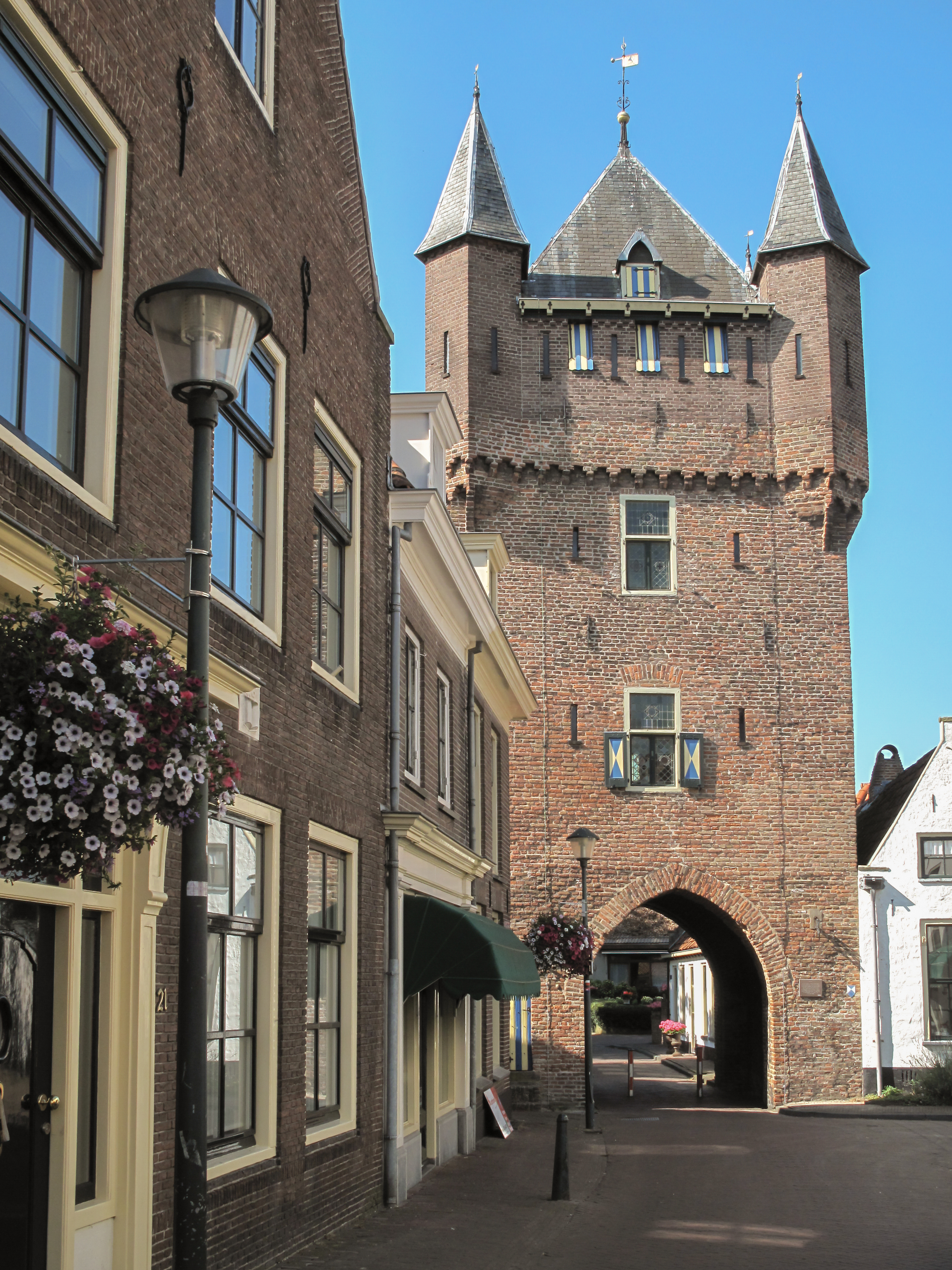
Hattem, town-gate de Dijkpoort

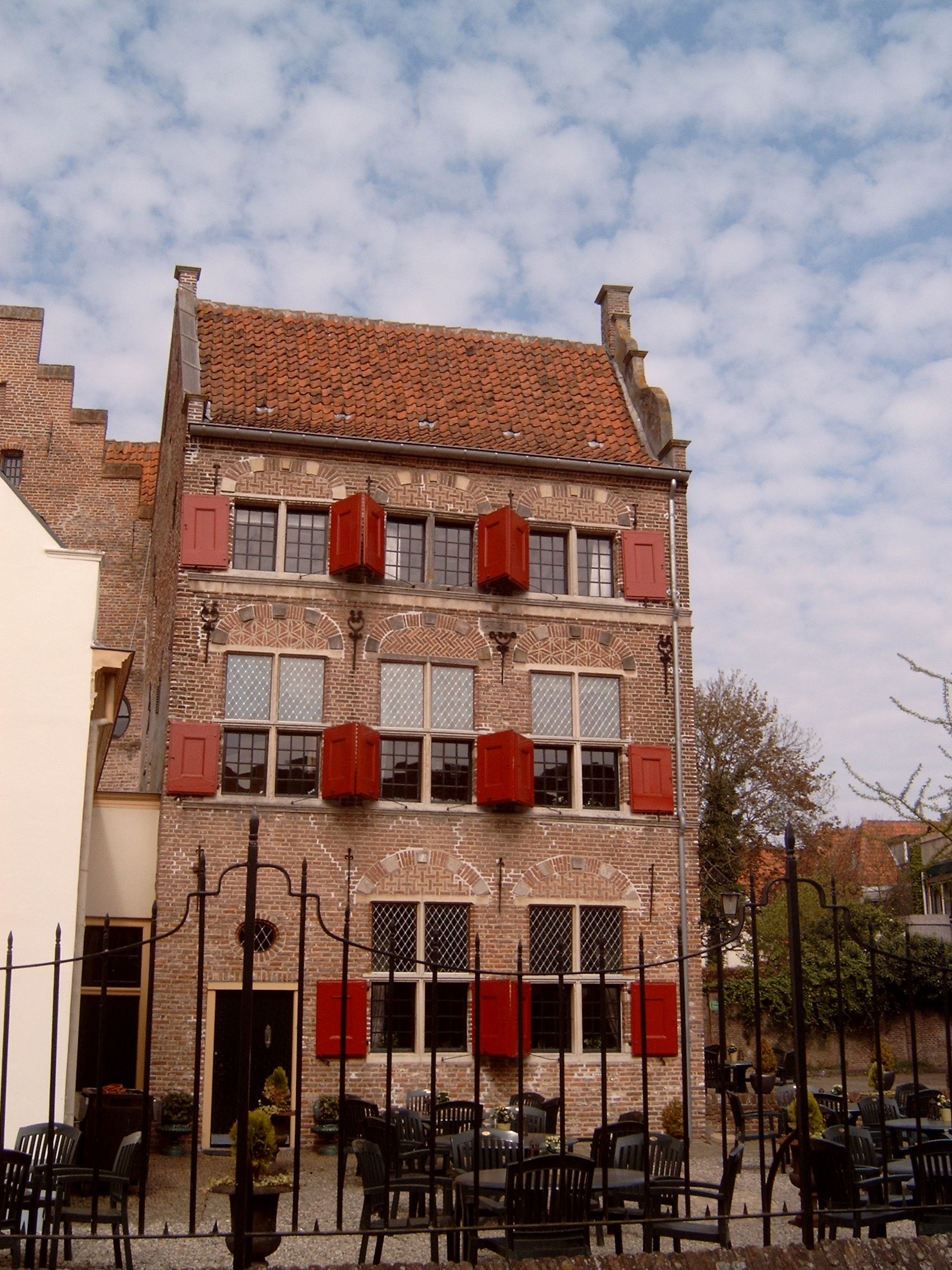
House of Herman Willem Daendels

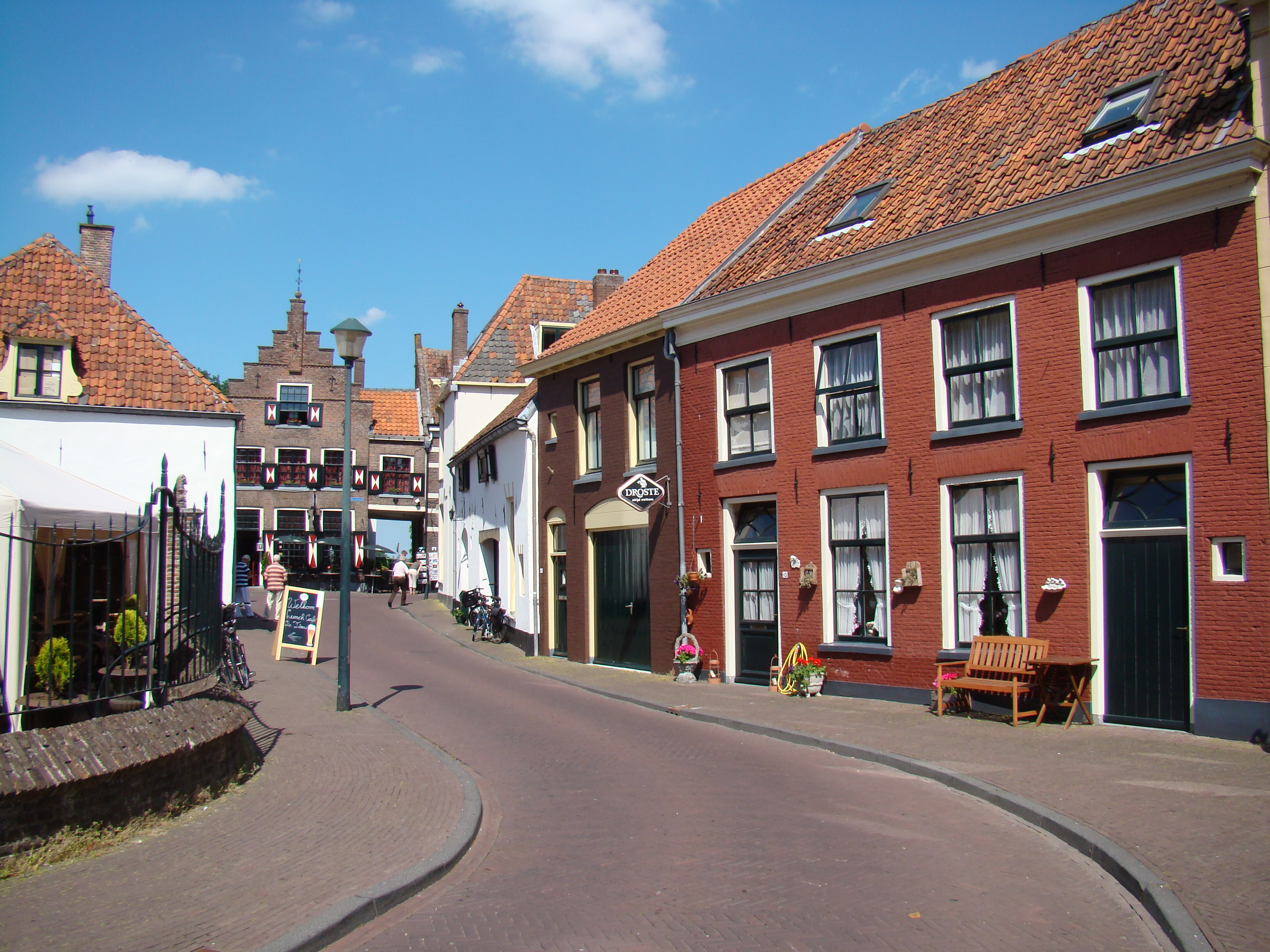
het Warme Land

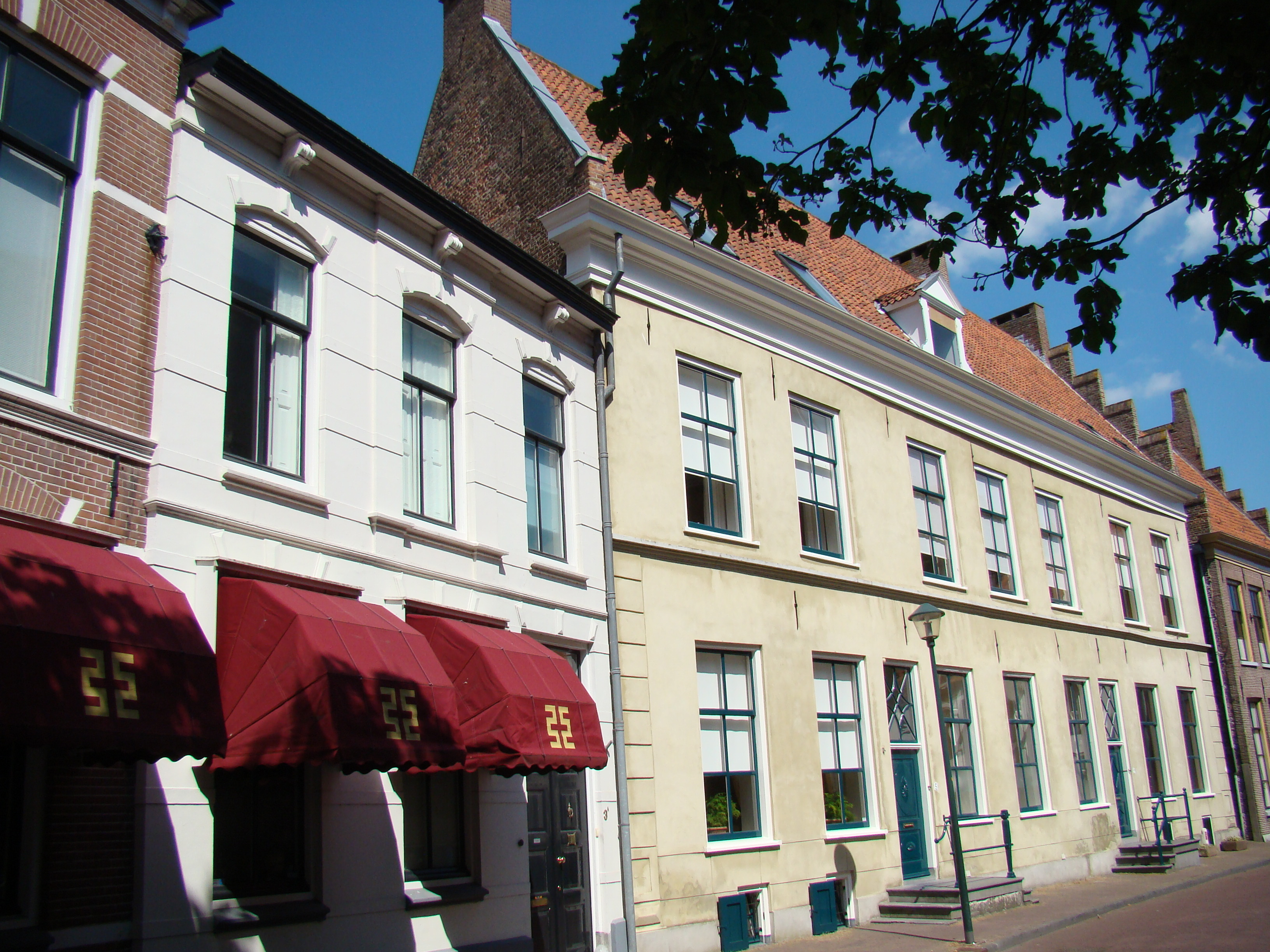
Kerkhofstraat

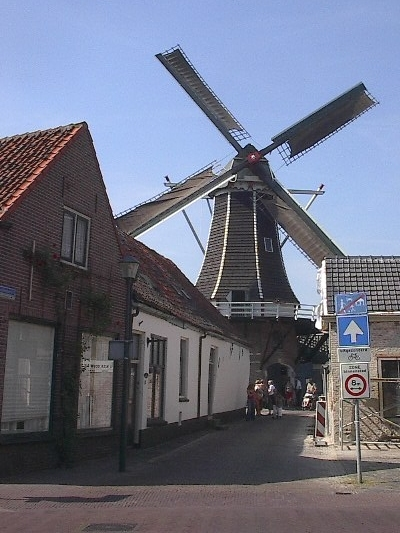
Windmill De Fortuin

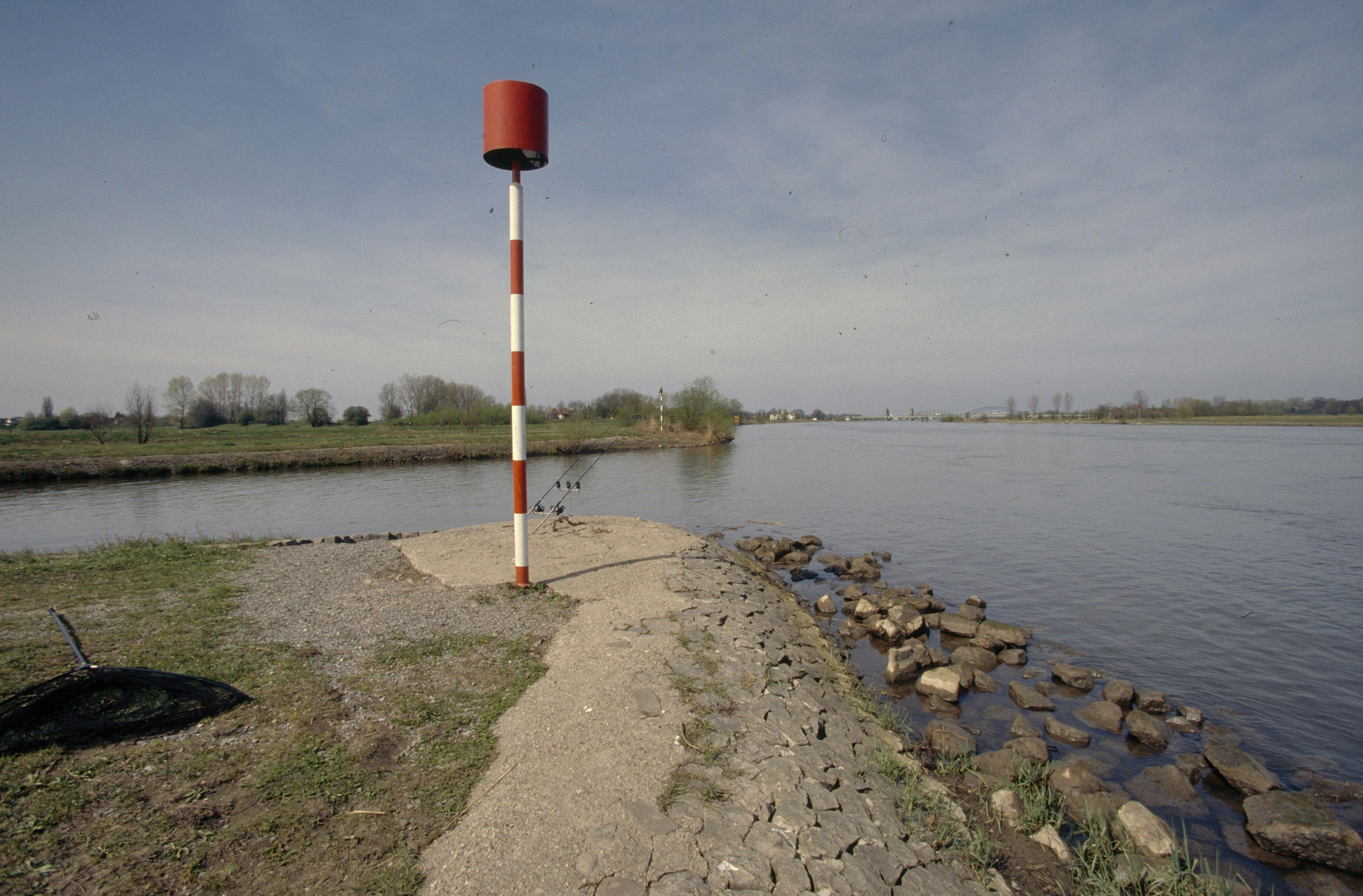
Monding van het Apeldoorns Kanaal in de IJssel bij Hattem - Hattem

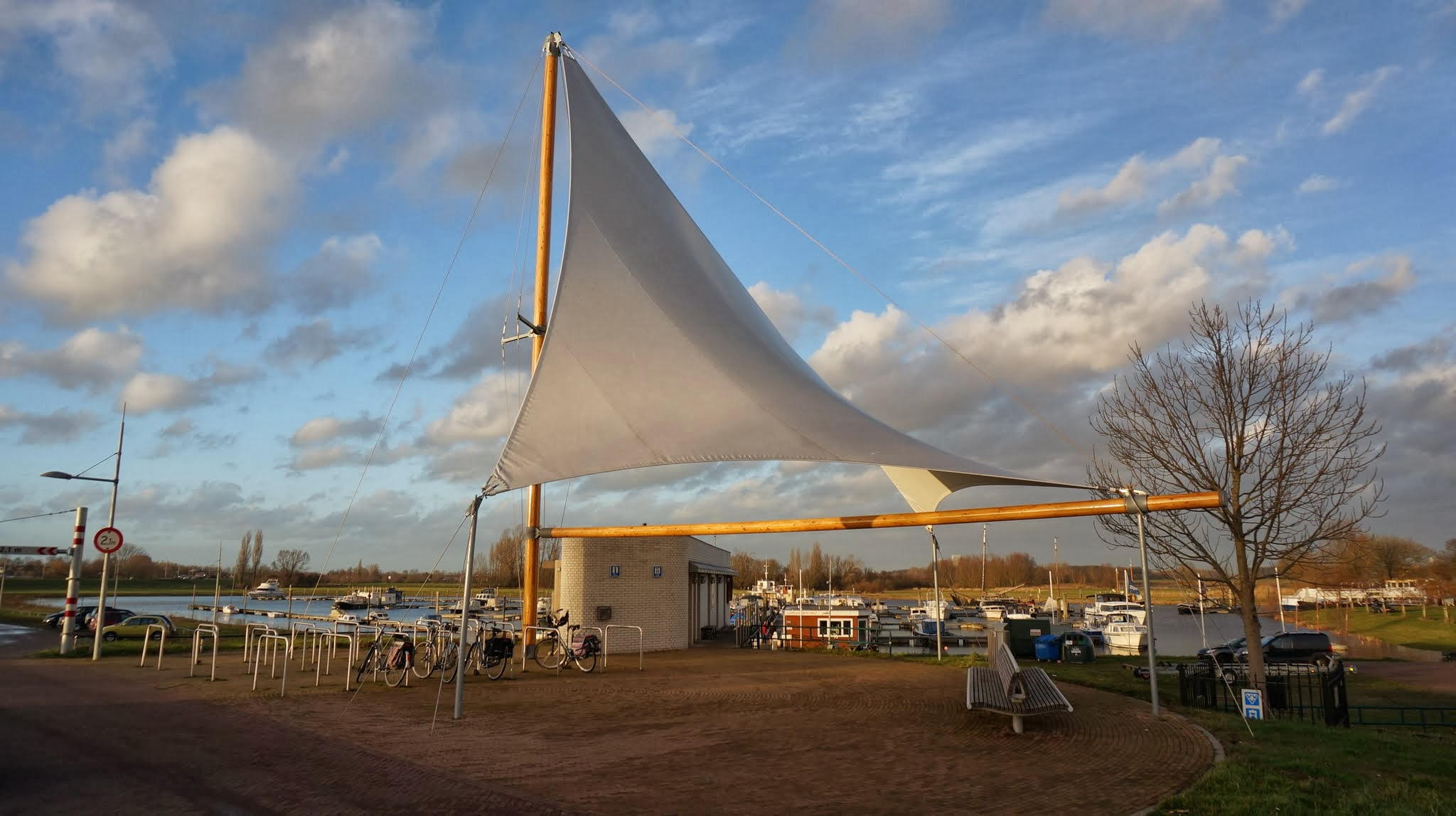
Hattem

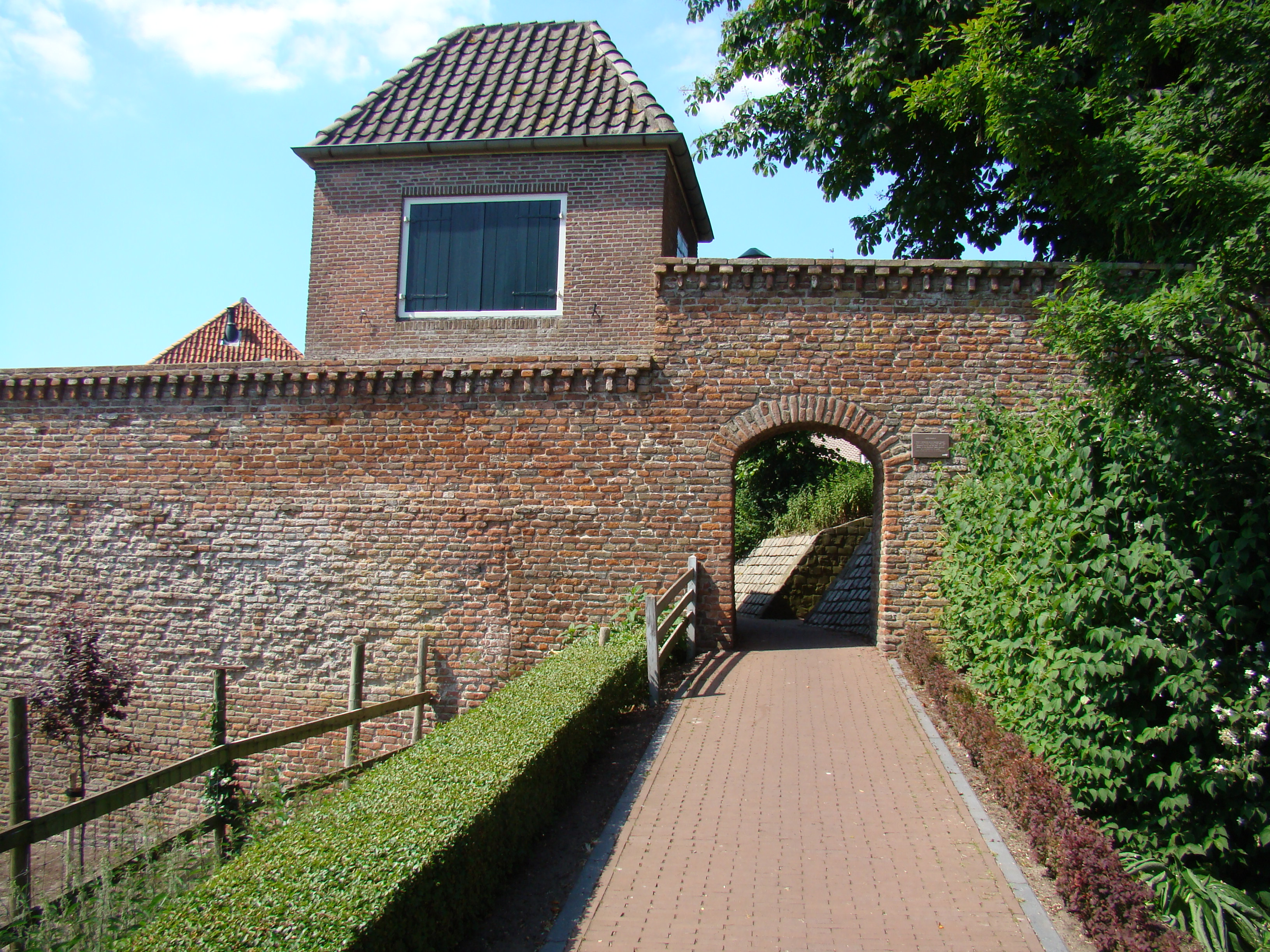
Citywall at the level of the Daendelspoortje
