= 't Zand, Hattem =

't Zand
- Hamlet
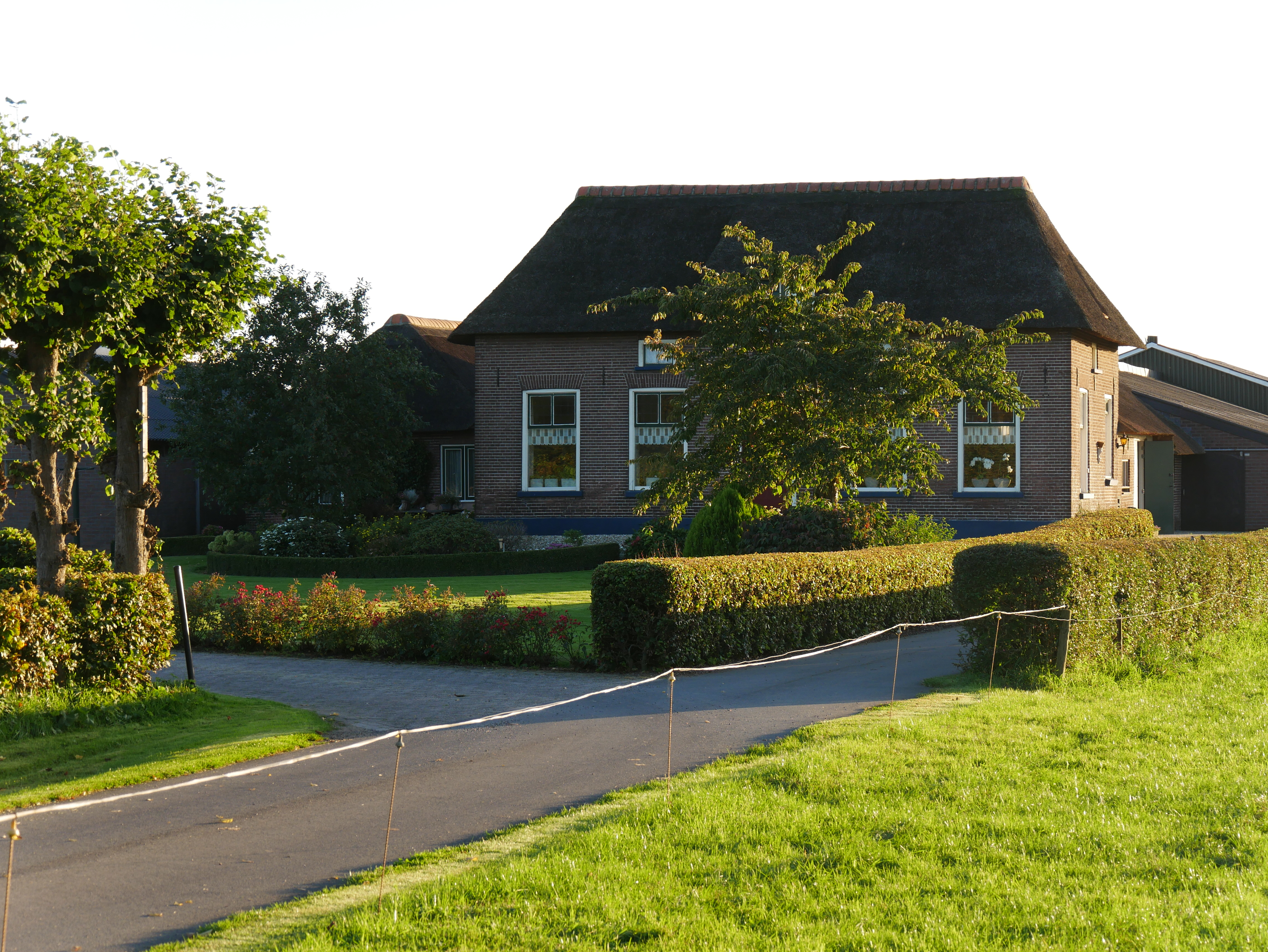
- Farm in 't Zand

- Location in the Netherlands 't Zand (Netherlands)
- Coordinates: 52°29′55″N 6°1′5″E
- Country: Netherlands
- Province: Gelderland
- Municipality: Hattem
- Elevation: 4 m (13 ft)
- Time zone: UTC+1 (CET)
  - Summer (DST): UTC+2 (CEST)
- Postal code: 8051
- Dialing code: 038

't Zand is a hamlet in the Dutch province of Gelderland. It is located in the municipality of Hattem, about 6 km west of the city of Zwolle.

't Zand is not a statistical entity, and the postal authorities have placed it under Hattem. It consists of about 15 houses.
