= A Winter Scene with Skaters near a Castle =

Painting by Hendrick Avercamp

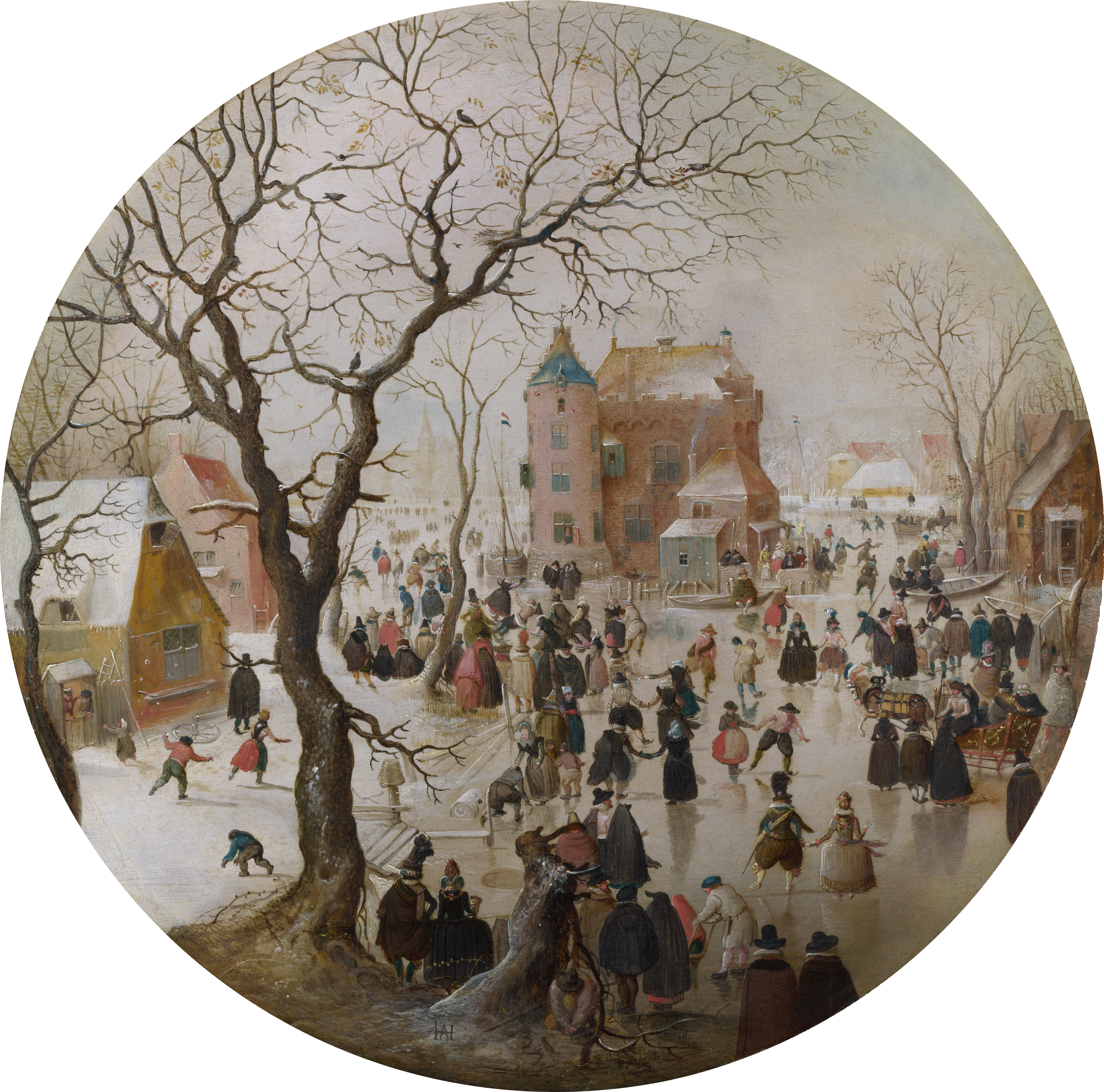
- Artist: Hendrick Avercamp
- Year: 1608–09
- Medium: Oil on oak
- Dimensions: 40.7 cm × 40.7 cm (16.0 in × 16.0 in)
- Location: National Gallery; London

A Winter Scene with Skaters near a Castle is an oil-on-oak painting undertaken between 1608 and 1609 by the Dutch artist Hendrick Avercamp.

As with a number of Avercamp's works, the picture is part of the Flemish tradition of painting "the harmony of human activity and the cycle of nature". He was influenced in his subject by the Little Ice Age, particularly the cold winter of 1607–08, and was the first of the Dutch painters to specialise in snow scenes.

The painting was acquired by the National Gallery in London in 1891 and remains in its collection, as at 2020. On acquisition it was square in shape, but during cleaning in 1983 it was established that Avercamp's original was circular, and the surrounding pieces were made by another artist. The gallery removed the additions.

== Sources ==
- Burroughs, William (18 December 1980). "The Art of the Weather". New Scientist. 88 (1232): 768–69.
- The Illustrated Story of Art. London: Dorling Kindersley. 2013. ISBN 978-1-4093-1608-4.
- Langmuir, Erica (1997). The National Gallery Companion Guide. London: National Gallery Company. ISBN 978-1-85709-218-9.
