= Bovenkerk, Kampen =

Gothic church in Kampen, Overijssel, Netherlands

Bovenkerk
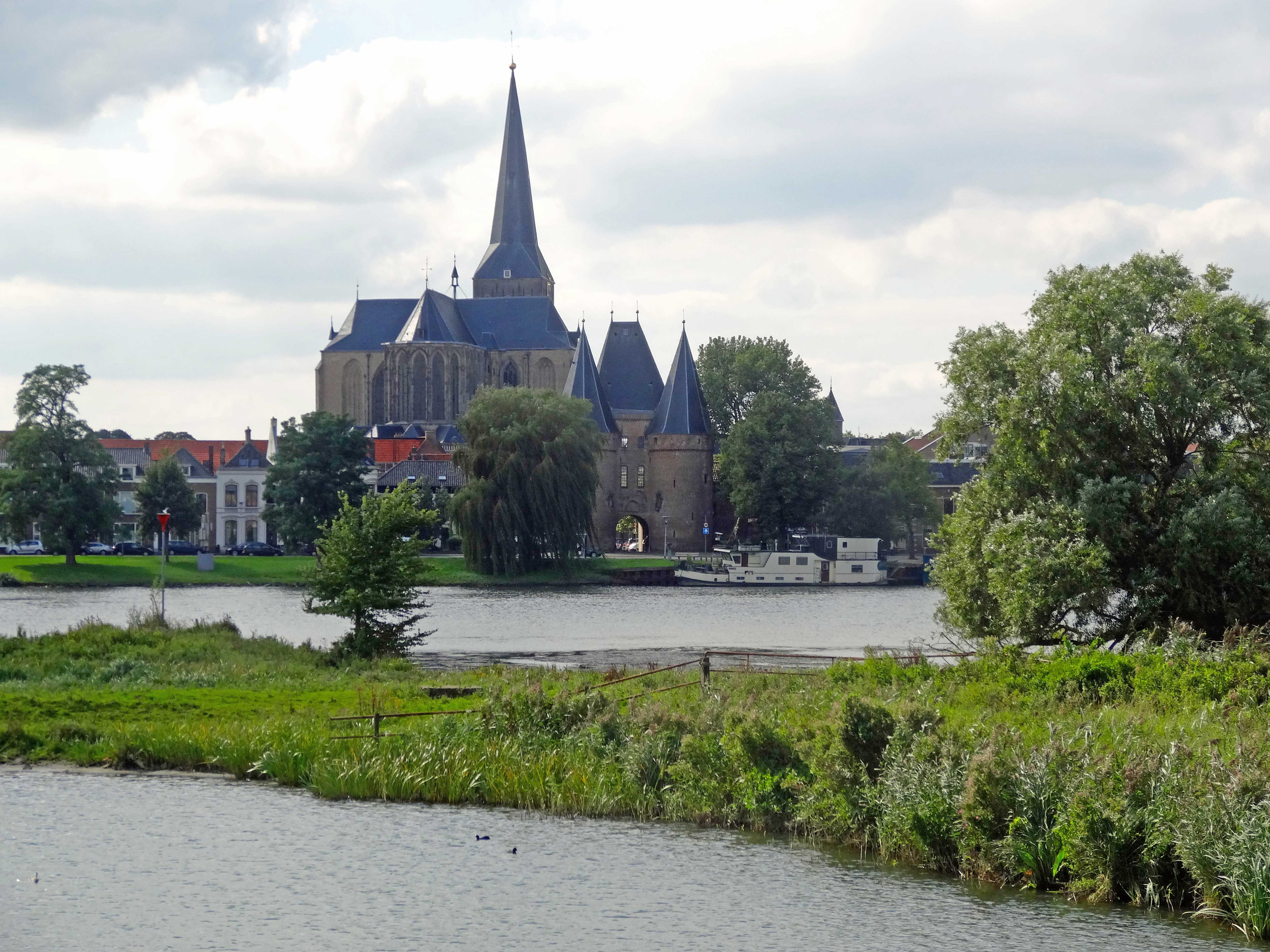
- View of the Bovenkerk and the Koornmarktpoort, Kampen

- Location in Overijssel in the Netherlands

Religion
- Affiliation: Reformed
- Province: Overijssel

Location
- Location: Koornmarkt 28, Kampen, Netherlands
- Municipality: Kampen
- Interactive map of Bovenkerk
- Coordinates: 52.555°N 5.920278°E

Architecture
- Type: Church
- Style: Gothic
- Capacity: 1250

Website
- http://www.debovenkerk.nl

The Bovenkerk (English: Upper Church; also known as the Church of St. Nicholas) is a large, Gothic church and the most striking element on the skyline of Kampen, Overijssel, Netherlands. The interior of the church contains an early-Renaissance choir screen, a stone pulpit and a monumental organ. The church has 1,250 seats. It is a Reformed church.

== The Construction ==
The construction of the church took place in several phases:

- Construction of a Romanesque church (12th century)
- Construction of Early Gothic church (last quarter of 13th century)
- Church gets a basilica choir (last quarter of 14th century)
- Plan for a basilica nave fails (early 15th century)
- The construction is completed (second half 15th century)

== Graves ==
A common practice for old historic churches was to bury the dead under the Church. The Bovenkerk is no exception to this practice, where famous Dutch persons originating from Kampen are buried. One of them is Hendrick Avercamp (1585-1634), one of the first landscape painters of the 17th-century Dutch school, specialized in painting the Netherlands in winter. Another is Jan Bantjes (1700-1779) and Jacomina Leussen (1707-1770) who were wealthy landowners, shipowners, financiers of Berbice plantations and privateers. Their eldest son Gerrit (Jan Geerts) Bantjes (1734-1782) who left for the Cape of Good Hope in Nov.1754 started a line of descendants who laid down prominent South African history such as the exploratory Kommissitrek of 1834 to Port Natal to find a new homeland for the Cape Boers, the Natal-land Report which started The Great Trek (1837–38) and the battles that followed, the Discovery of the Witwatersrand Gold Reef in 1884 and the founding of Johannesburg in 1886. This same Bantjes line gave South Africa's first two presidents their grounding education and were instrumental in influencing the Anglo-Boer War (1899-1902) setting Germany and Great Britain on a collision course. Back to the church, the transept contains a small ornament of red marble with a green marble urn in memory of Vice Admiral Jan Willem de Winter (1761-1812). The heart of Vice Admiral De Winter is enclosed in this urn, while his body is buried in the Panthéon in Paris.

== Gallery ==
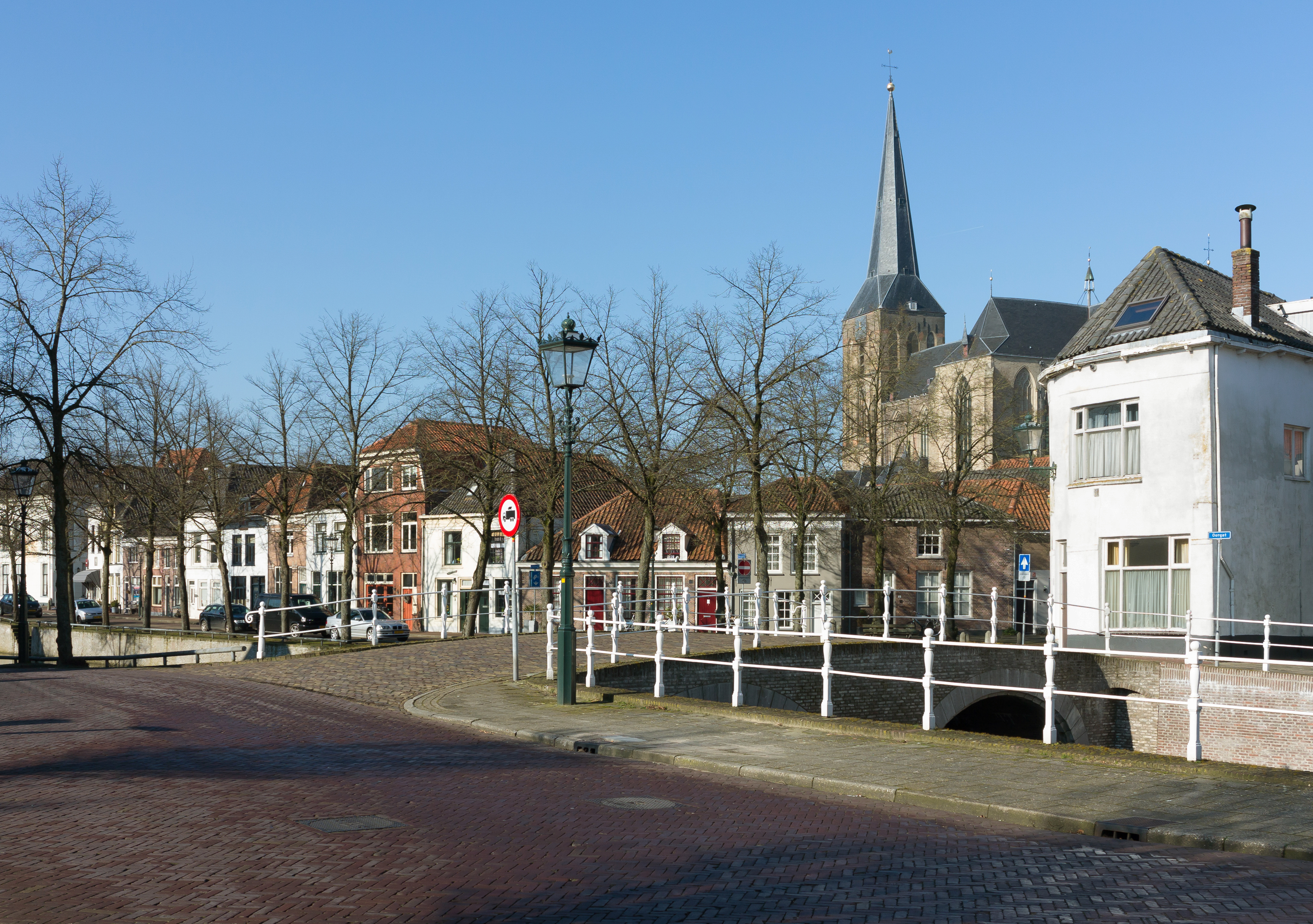
The Bovenkerk from the Prinsenstraat-Burgwal

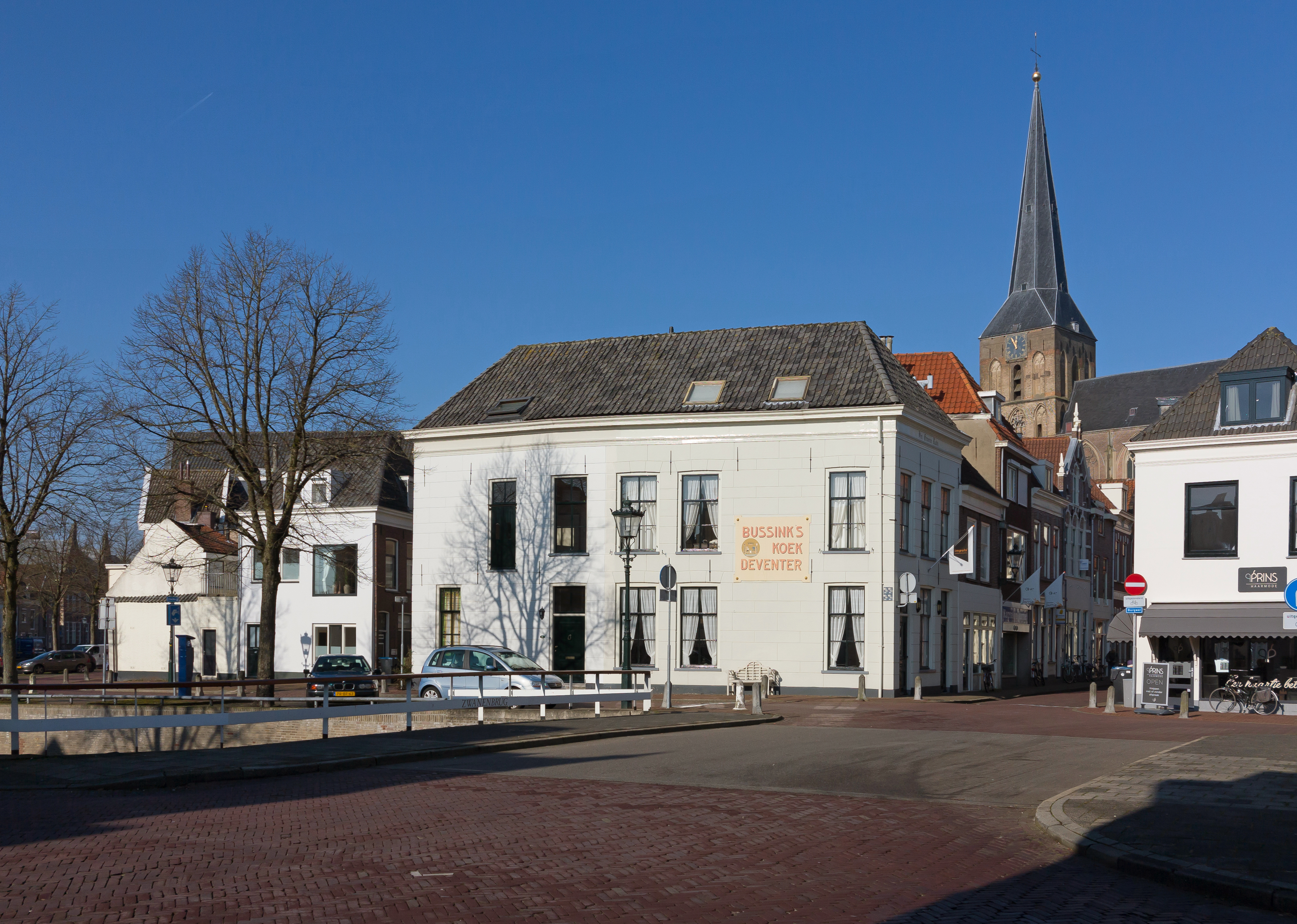
The Bovenkerk from the Vloeddijk-Venestraat

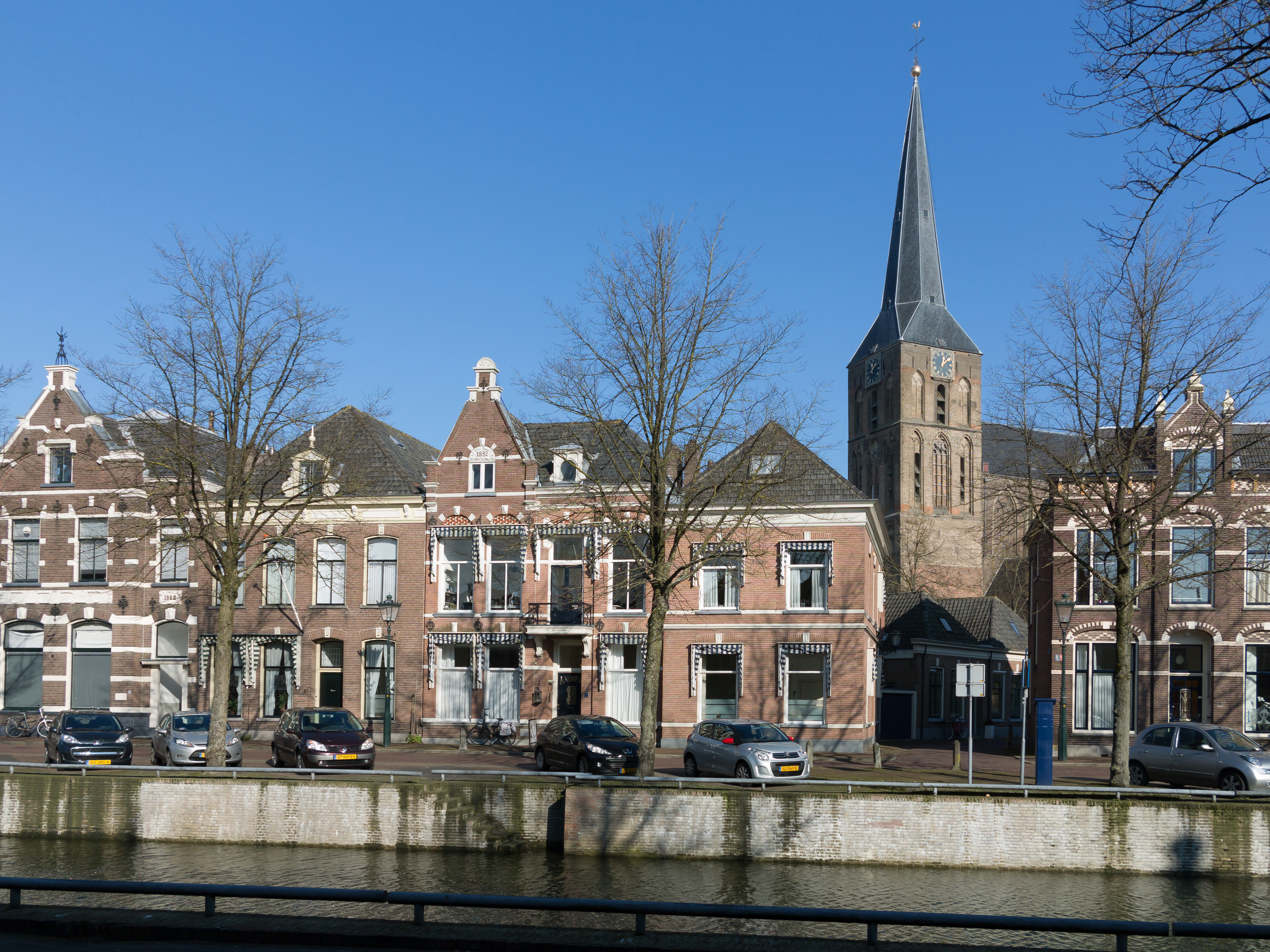
The Bovenkerk from the Vloeddijk-Muntsteeg
