= Flush =

Flush may refer to:

== Architecture, construction and manufacturing ==
- Flush cut, a type of cut made with a French flush-cut saw or diagonal pliers
- Flush deck, in naval architecture
- Flush door
- Flush hem (hemming and seaming), in metal forming
- Flush hole, a countersink
- Flush rivet, countersunk rivets

== Art, entertainment, and media ==
- Flush (cards), a hand in card games
  - Flush (poker), a type of poker hand
  - See also: Royal flush
- Flush (slalom skiing), a consecutive series of vertical gates
- Flush (novel), a young adult novel by Carl Hiaasen
- Flush: A Biography, an imaginative fictional biography of Elizabeth Barrett Browning's dog, by Virginia Woolf
- "Flush" (Mötley Crüe song), 1997
- "Flush" (Brian Welch song), 2008
- Flush (film), a 1977 American comedy film

== Biology, botany, and healthcare ==
- Flush (physiology), to become markedly red in the face and often other areas of the skin, from various physiological conditions
- Flush, a growth of leaves on the tea plant
- Harris flush, an enema type
- Saline flush
- Seep (hydrology), a seepage or flush of water from low-lying ground

== Computing ==
- Allocate-on-flush, a computer file system
- Cache flush, when a CPU cache is emptied

== Other uses ==
- Flush, Kansas, a community in the United States
- First flush, the initial surface runoff of a rainstorm
- Flush text, in justification
- Flush toilet, a toilet using water to dispose of waste, the operation of which is called a "flush"

== See also ==
- Flushed (disambiguation)
- Flushing (disambiguation)
- Royal flush (disambiguation)
