= Vlissingen (disambiguation) =

Vlissingen is a city in Zeeland, Netherlands.

Vlissingen, Van Vlissingen, or, variation, may also refer to:

== Places ==
- Vlissingen (town), Nieuw Nederland (English: Flushing, New Netherland), former name of Flushing (Queens), NYC, NYS, USA
- Vlissingen (river), Nieuw Nederland (English: Flushing River, New Netherland), former name of Flushing Creek, NYC, NYS, USA
- Nieuw Vlissingen, Nieuw Walcheren, Tobago, West-Indische (English: New Flushing, New Walcheren, Tobago, Dutch West Indies), a Dutch colonial settlement; former name of Plymouth, Tobago, Trinidad and Tobago
- Vlissingen (street) Georgetown, Guyana

=== Facilities and structures ===
- Fort Vlissingen, Wang-an, Penghu, Pescadores Islands; a 17th century fort of the Dutch East India Company
- Vlissingen Naval Base, Vlissingen, Zeeland, Netherlands; a Dutch naval base
- Vlissingen Navy Drydock, Vlissingen, Zeeland, Netherlands; an Admiralty drydock predating the naval base
- Rijkswerf Vlissingen, a shipyard later subsumed into the naval base
- Vlissingen railway station, Vlissingen, Zeeland, Netherlands; a Dutch train station
- Roosendaal–Vlissingen railway, Netherlands

== People ==
- Arthur Van Vlissingen Jr. (1894-1986), a U.S. business writer

=== Fictional characters ===
- Miss Vlissingen, a fictional character from the 1939 U.S. film Slightly Honorable

== Other uses ==
- HNLMS Vlissingen, mine countermeasure vessel of the Royal Netherlands Navy
- Van Vlissingen and Co. (est 1879), a U.S. real estate developer
- VC Vlissingen, Vlissingen, Zeeland, Netherlands; a Dutch soccer team

== See also ==
- Fentener van Vlissingen, a Dutch mercantile dynasty and family name
- Vlissingen Souburg railway station, Zeeland, Netherlands; a train station on the border with Belgium
- Flushing (disambiguation), a word derived from Vlissingen
