= Flushed (disambiguation) =

Flushed may refer to:

- Flushing (physiology)
- Flushed (film)
- Flushed (game show)
- "Flushed" (Coupling)
- "Flushed" (Dark Angel)

== See also ==
- Flush (disambiguation)
- Flushing (disambiguation)
