= Veneer saw =

Hand tool

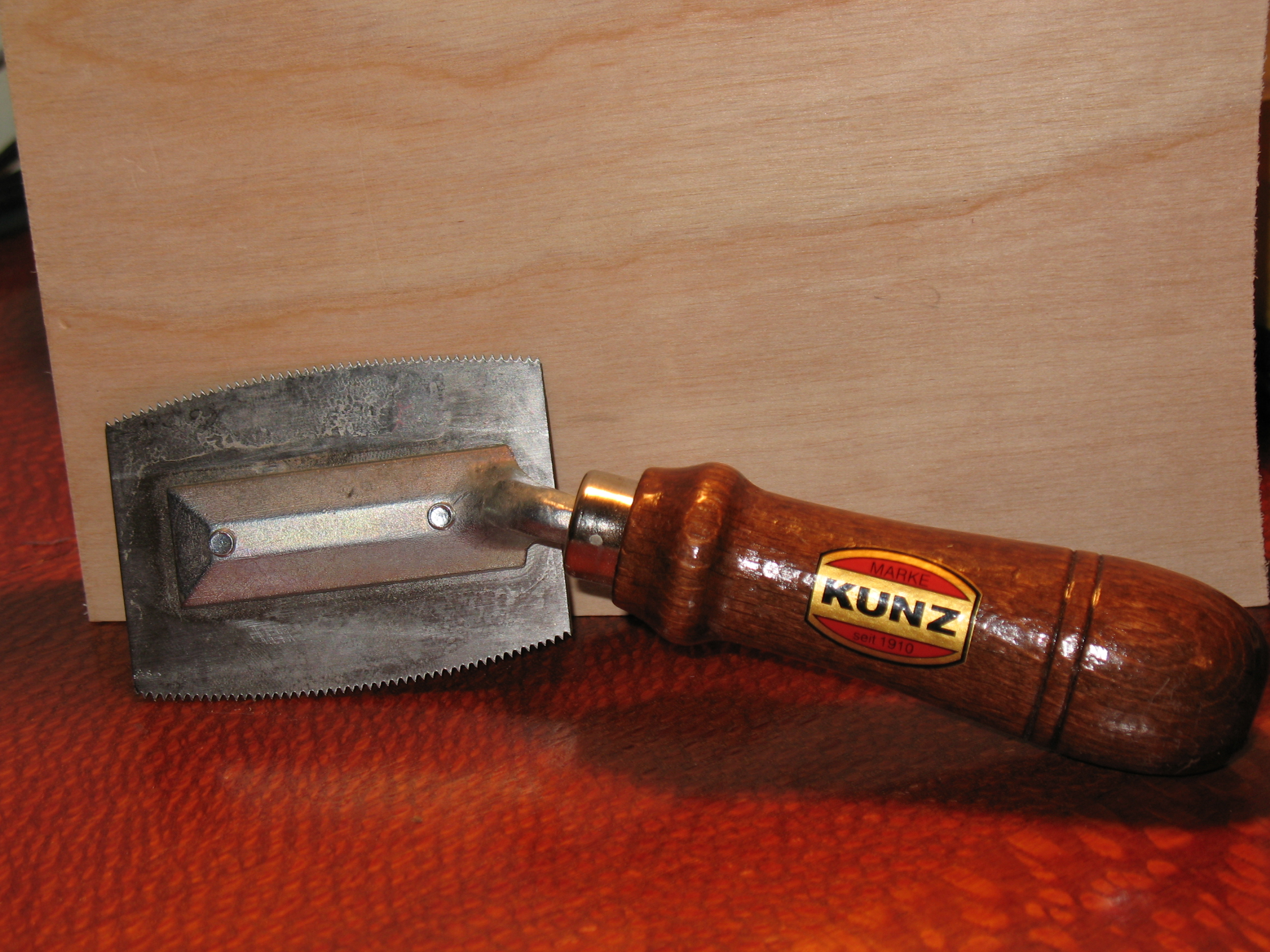

The veneer saw is a small double-edged tool for cutting thin hardwood veneer. If one edge is dulled, the blade can be removed from the handle and remounted on the handle with its small screws. One both sides of the blade are dull, it can be sharpened. The narrow curved blade facilitates precision work, and its elevated offset handle makes it possible to cut flush with a surface. The blade is usually 75 or 100 millimetres (3 or 4 in) long and it has 13 teeth per inch (approximately 2 mm between each tooth).

A similarly shaped tool, known as a French flush-cut saw is designed for trimming the ends of dowels, tenons, and other protrusions flush with a surface.
