= Flushing =

Flushing may refer to:

== Places ==
=== Netherlands ===
- Flushing, Netherlands, an English name for the city of Vlissingen, Netherlands

=== United Kingdom ===
- Flushing, Cornwall, a village in Cornwall, England
- The Flushing, a building in Suffolk, England

=== United States ===
- Flushing, Queens, New York City
  - Flushing Bay, a bay off the north shore of Queens
  - Flushing Chinatown (法拉盛華埠), a community in Queens
  - Flushing Meadows, a park in Queens which includes multiple venues, such as the location of the US Open tennis tournament
  - Flushing River, in Queens
- Flushing, Michigan, a city in Genesee County
- Flushing, Ohio, a village in Belmont County
- Flushing Township, Belmont County, Ohio
- Flushing Township, Michigan

== Other uses ==
- Flushing (military tactic), related to skirmishing
- Flushing (physiology), the warm, red condition of human skin
- Flushing dog, a hunting dog
- Flushing hydrant, a device to flush water mains
- Flushing Remonstrance, a demand for religious liberty made to Peter Stuyvesant, the Governor of the Dutch colony of New Netherland, in 1657
- Flushing a flush toilet

== See also ==
- Vlissingen (disambiguation), also called "Flushing"
- Flush (disambiguation)
- Flushed (disambiguation)
