= HNLMS De Ruyter (1853) =

Ship built for the Royal Netherlands Navy

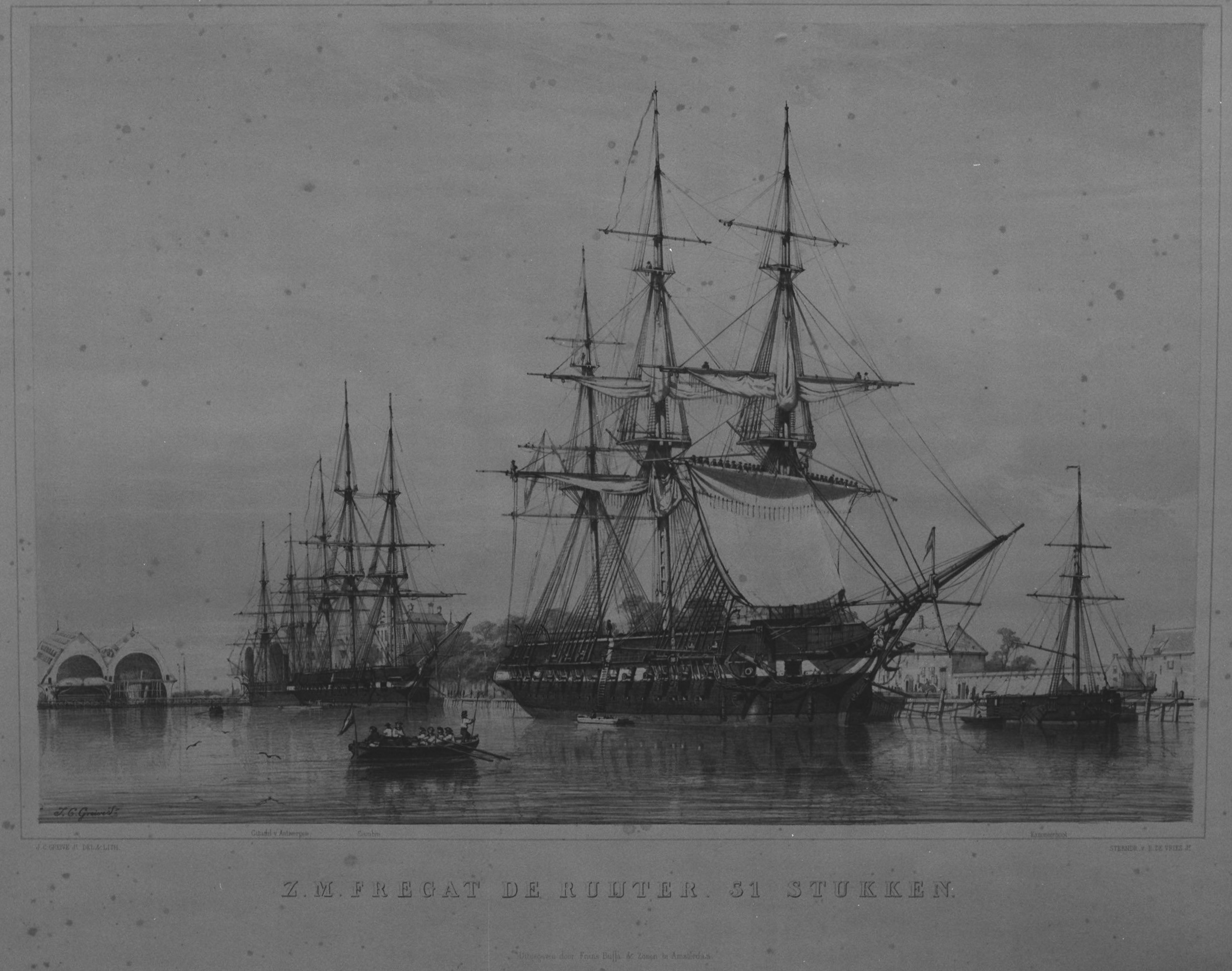
- De Ruyter in the dock of Vlissingen in 1858

History

Netherlands
- Name: De Ruyter
- Namesake: Michiel de Ruyter
- Builder: Rijkswerf Vlissingen
- Laid down: 1831
- Launched: 5 August 1853
- Commissioned: 21 August 1854
- Decommissioned: 15 June 1859
- Refit: 18 September 1861

General characteristics (as completed)
- Installed power: 400 nominal horsepower (after conversion)
- Armament: 1 * 60-pdr; 22 * 30-pdr Medium No 3; 22 * 36-pdr Long; 8 * Shell gun 20 cm No 1
- Armour: none

HNLMS De Ruyter, was a unique ship built for the Royal Netherlands Navy. She first served as a heavy sailing frigate, before later being rebuilt as a steam frigate, albeit finishing as was intended. She was finally rebuilt and served as a Casemate ironclad comparable to the CSS Virginia.

== Context ==
On 1 June 1842, J.C. Rijk became head (Dutch: Directeur-generaal) of the Dutch navy. On 18 June 1843, he became Secretary for the Navy. At the time, the navy had been severely neglected because of the secession of Belgium and the war and tensions that followed. Under Rijk, the navy would have to economize, to become smaller, and to modernize. Rijk wrote about his policy early in a letter that was approved by the king on 25 January 1843 and known as 'Plan Rijk' (Dutch: Stelsel Rijk).

The Plan Rijk called for 2 ships of the line of 84 guns and 4 ships of the line of 74 guns all of them existing or under construction. Rijk noted that he did not want to build more ships of the line, but also did not want to razee the existing ones for the moment. The number of heavy frigates should be raised to 4. One of these was already in service, two were already in the water, and the fourth should be found by razeeing either the existing small ship of the line Kortenaar, or the small ship of the line De Ruyter, still under construction in Vlissingen. Rijk also observed that the caliber of the guns on a ship seemed to become more important than the number of guns on a ship. This is in line with his proposition to razee a ship instead of building another heavy frigate according to the existing models.

By the time that De Ruyter was finally launched screw propulsion had made sail-only frigates obsolete. In the late 1850s, a reconstruction along the lines of the HNLMS Wassenaar (1856) fit the new Dutch naval system (Plan 1855) calling for a fleet of steam frigates of 400 hp, steam corvettes of 250 hp, and steam sloops of 100hp.

== Characteristics ==
=== Design ===
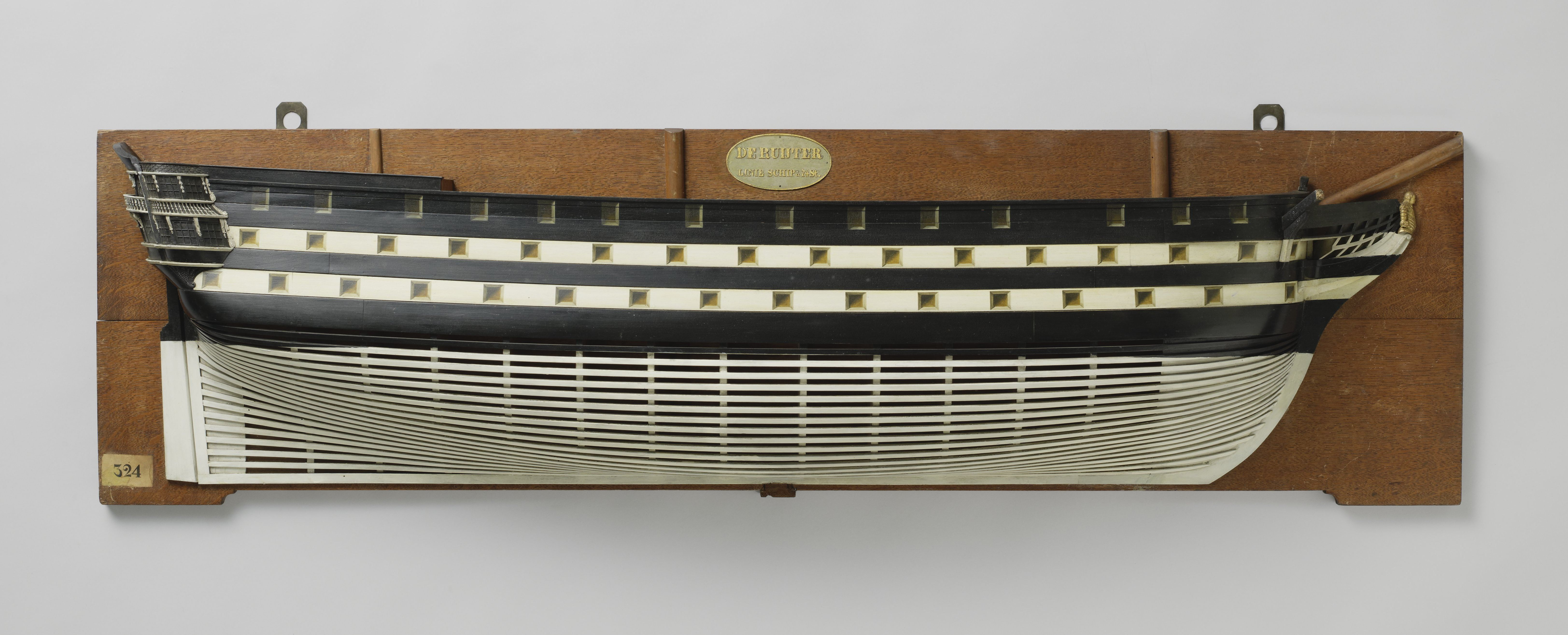
Model of the De Ruyter as a small ship of the line of 74 guns in 1831

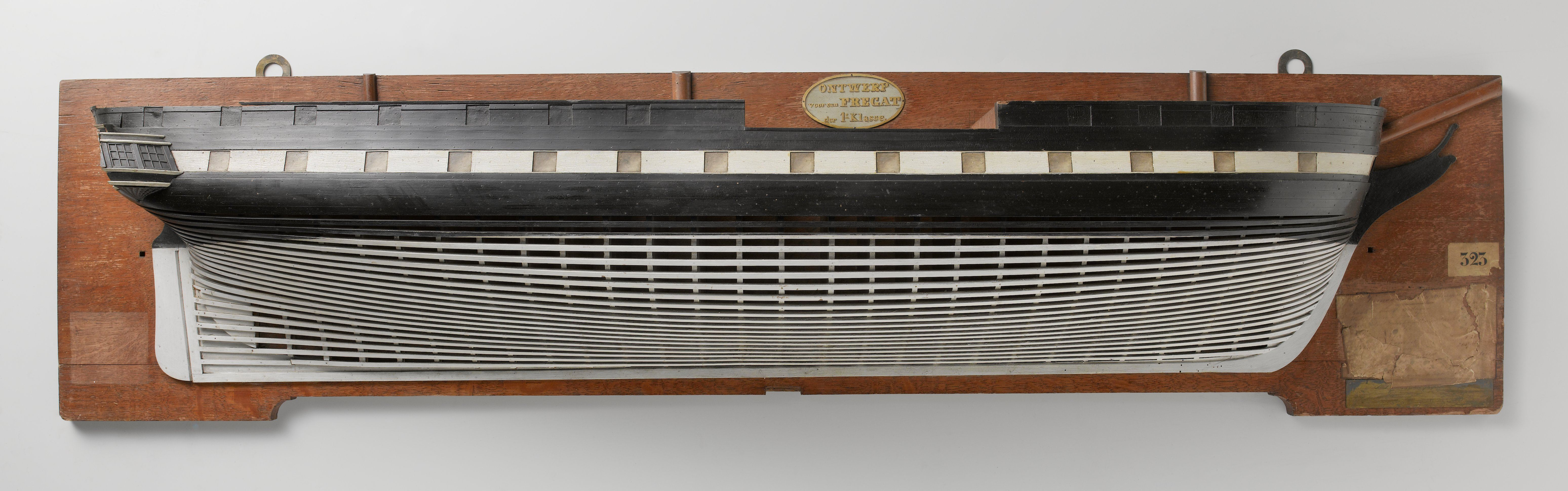
Model of the De Ruyter as a razeed frigate first class of 51 guns in 1843

The initial design of De Ruyter was that of a small ship of the line. A so-called ship of the line of the second class of 74 guns. She was laid down in 1831. Other small ships of the line laid down at about the same time were the Wassenaar (1833), and the Tromp (1830). These might all have been of the same class. While still under construction the De Ruyter and the Wassenaar were razeed, or redesigned as heavy frigates, known in the Dutch navy as 'frigates 1st class'. This might have been done according to the same plan, implying that for some time there was a 'De Ruyter class' of razees comprising the De Ruyter and the Wassenaar. The fact that in 1851 the De Ruyter was finished 30% and the Wassenaar was 35% ready, gives credence to this theory.

De Ruyter was not similar to the frigates first class laid down at about the same time which had been designed as such from the start. These were the Prins van Oranje (ex-Waal) and Doggersbank. These had about the same beam as De Ruyter and Wassenaar, but they were balanced designs. The Doggersbank was designed for 30 medium 30-pounders and 30 30-pounder carronades, that is two batteries in a neat lay-out. De Ruyter had the main battery of a ship of the line.

=== Machinery ===
As a sail only frigate De Ruyter did not have engines. In her planned and almost completed conversion to a frigate with auxiliary power, she received a 400 hp steam engine.

=== Armament ===
De Ruyter and Wassenaar were planned to mount 54 guns. On De Ruyter the main battery was that of a ship of the line, i.e. 36-pounders. The Wassenaar would mount the 30-pounder long No 4. Both guns were comparable to the heaviest guns that foreign ships of the line traditionally mounted. In 1853 there was a general order for the armament of ships. The Razee De Ruyter would mount: 22 long 36-pounders and 8 20 cm grenade guns No 1. On the upper deck she would have 22 medium 30-pounders No 3, and 1 long 60-pounder. Note that the 36-pounder was the same gun traditionally found on the lower decks of French ships of the line.

=== Criticism ===
The decision first to convert De Ruyter to use auxiliary steam power, and then to cease the conversion following the expenditure of around eight hundred thousand guilders, attracted criticism. She was next converted to a casemate ironclad, another expensive process which failed to render a ship comparable to the modern ships in foreign service. Between them, these two conversion projects amounted to a great deal of expenditure on a single ship with limited results.

== Construction and commissioning ==
De Ruyter was laid down as a ship of the line in Vlissingen in 1831. On 5 August 1853 she was launched as a heavy sailing frigate. On 2 August 1854 captain F.X.R. 't Hooft was known to become her first commander.

De Ruyter was commissioned on 21 August 1854 On 27 August 1854 it became known that De Ruyter would bring the new Naval commander of the East Indies to his post. This would be Rear Admiral J.F.D. Bouricius. Bouricius and other passengers would stay in the captain's quarters, and therefore new cabins were added on the upper deck. A hundred extra sailors would also take De Ruyter to go to the East Indies. On 11 September the paddle steamer Cycloop brought sailors from Nieuwediep/Willemsoord. By mid September a marine from Nieuwediep brought Cholera on board. Of 26 patients, four had died by 19 September. One of the measures that was taken was to disembark half of the crew, which had grown to 531 men.

== Service ==
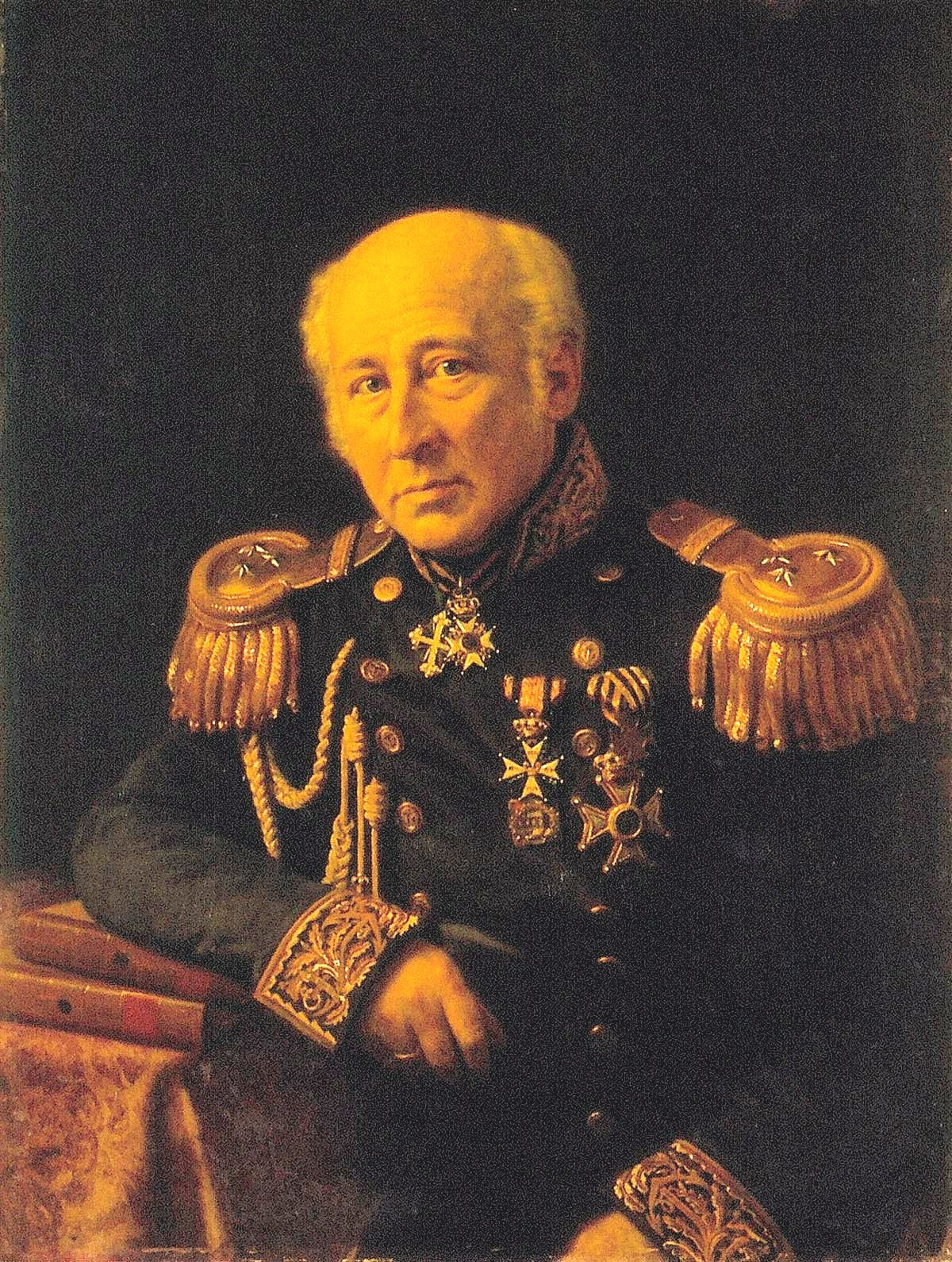
Jan Frederik Daniël Bouricius (1799-1859)

=== First voyage to the Dutch East Indies ===
On 21 October 1854 De Ruyter left the dock of Vlissingen and anchored in the harbor (roadstead) of Vlissingen. On 24 October the Secretary for the Navy arrived in Vlissingen. On the 25th the Cycloop arrived with 60 more sailors. On the 26th the secretary christened the Evertsen, that had been laid down on the 25th, but he did not inspect the De Ruyter or the Doggersbank. On 9 November the commander of the naval base Vlissingen inspected the frigate. On 10 November Rear Admiral J.F.D. Bouricius, his daughter and ADC arrived at Hotel Wellington. On 15 November a first attempt to sail was discontinued because of fog. On 16 November at 8 in the morning the De Ruyter set sail with a powerful South East wind. The crew consisted of 650 men of whom 56 officers.

On 27 November 1854 De Ruyter was seen on 23.4 N 22.3 W. On 9 December she was hailed on 9.33 N 24.22 W. On 19 January 1855 she anchored in Table Bay from whence she left on 29 January. After colliding with a Danish barque during a dark night in Sunda Strait she anchored at Batavia on 21 March 1855. On 28 March Bouricius took over command of the navy in the Dutch East Indies. His predecessor VA E.G. van der Plaat and wife would return home with De Ruyter together with many other officers and sailors.

On 22 April 1855 De Ruyter left Batavia again for the Netherlands. On 18 June she arrived in Saint Helena, from whence she left on the 24th. On 5 August she arrived before Nieuwediep. She entered the harbor on 22 August

=== First cruise to the Mediterranean ===
In October 1855 captain Stavenisse de Braauw was known to become the next commander of De Ruyter. Her next trip would go to the Mediterranean. In November the day of departure for her and the brig Zeehond was set on the 15th. On 28 November De Ruyter and the Zeehond finally left Texel for the Mediterranean. On 30 December both arrived in La Spezia. On 16 February 1856 De Ruyter arrived in Alexandria. On 8 March she was in Malta. While dressing for a ball on the evening of the 10th, Stavenisse de Braauw got a stroke. De Ruyter nevertheless arrived in Genoa on 13 March. Captain H.J. van Maldeghem travelled to Toulon to take over command on the arrival of De Ruyter in that place. On 10 May or shortly before De Ruyter arrived in Toulon. De Ruyter was expected to sail from Toulon to the Netherlands on 18 May. On 7 June she left Malaga. On 13 June she was hailed near Lisbon. On 1 July she was sighted near Lizard Point, Cornwall. On 7 July De Ruyter anchored before Nieuwediep.

On 1 August many spectators came to hear the music of De Ruyter while it prepared to leave the harbor of Nieuwediep. She was tugged out by a private tugboat and then left Nieuwediep for a six-week cruise on the North Sea. She first sailed to Cherbourg, and on 15 August she arrived in Spithead. On 17 August she was near Dungeness (headland). On 30 August De Ruyter was back in Texel, and in the afternoon she was tugged in. On 3 September she would be brought into the harbor.

=== Second cruise to the Mediterranean ===
In mid-October there were plans for De Ruyter to make a second cruise in the Mediterranean starting 1 November. On 5 November she indeed sailed from Texel, and on 6 November she passed Dungeness. On 26 November she arrived in Malta. On 20 December 1856 she arrived in Smyrna. On 4 January 1857 the commander of De Ruyter sent a report about shipping in the Levant to The Hague. On 9 January she left for Scala Virulate and Athens. She was expected to leave Athens for Malta on 23 February. On 8 March the frigate Doggersbank was waiting in Mahon. The plan was that it would transfer part of its crew and supplies to De Ruyter before returning home. By 5 April this had been done, and Doggersbank would return home on the 6th. On 1 May De Ruyter arrived in Toulon. On 19 May she arrived in Marseille, towed in by the Bulldog. On 26 May she sailed for Tripoli. On 2 June the De Ruyter arrived in Tripoli, the first Dutch warship to do so in 20 years. She had on board the Dutch consul Ridder de Testa (probably Jhr. mr. Emilius Franciscus Eliodorus Testa (1821-1896)) and his family, who had been on leave in the Netherlands. On 3 June the officers and cadets went on shore, and the consul introduced them to the Pasha and the consuls of other powers. Local authorities then made a counter visit to the Dutch consulate. On the 4th there was a dinner and music at the consulate. In the evening of the 5th De Ruyter left Tripoli. On 20 June De Ruyter arrived back in Toulon from Tripoli.

=== Squadron in the Mediterranean ===
One of the ambitions of the Dutch navy was to train maneuvers with a squadron. The Mediterranean was the preferred location for these maneuvers, because it was better for the health of the sailors. On 18 July De Ruyter arrived in Lisbon, where she would wait for the steam corvette Groningen, which had the Prince of Orange on board. After the Groningen had arrived, the new frigate with auxiliary power Wassenaar arrived on 15 August. Next there were a lot of reciprocal visits, and an inspection of the Wassenaar and De Ruyter. On 30 August the brig Zeehond brought some cadets to the frigates. On 27 September De Ruyter arrived in Madeira. Plans were that she would continue to Tenerife. She indeed visited the Canary Islands and on 6 November she arrived in Cadiz. On 20 December she left Cadiz for Mahon. Contrary winds made that the Wassenaar anchored in Cagliari on 26 January, instead of reaching Mahon. The planned rendez-vous in Mahon with Wassenaar therefore failed. On 20 February De Ruyter finally arrived in Mahon. On 4 April 1858 De Ruyter was near Dungeness, having a pilot for Vlissingen on board. On 9 April she anchored in The Downs (ship anchorage). On 11 she continued her journey. On 15 April she anchored in Vlissingen. On 18 April she was brought into the harbor.

=== Second voyage to the Dutch East Indies ===
On 1 May 1858 Captain J.C. du Cloux became the new commander of De Ruyter. Meanwhile, the ship was hastily prepared for a trip to the East Indies. In early June 150 soldiers were ordered to go to Vlissingen and to embark on De Ruyter. On 10 June 120 barrels of silver coins worth 1,200,000 guilders arrived to be transported to the Indies. She was planned to sail on the 20th. On 25 June Prince Lobanoff, ADC of Grand Duke Konstantin Nikolayevich of Russia, who was modernizing the Russian fleet. visited De Ruyter and dined on board Evertsen. On 30 June the De Ruyter was still at anchor waiting for a favorable wind. She finally sailed for Batavia on 9 July. On 10 July she passed Dover. On 10 October she anchored in Simonsbaai, from whence she continued on 1 November. On 21 December she arrived in Batavia.

Apart from bringing the money and 150 soldiers, De Ruyter also exchanged most of her 350 men crew for sailors that had been waiting to return home. On 23 January 1859 De Ruyter left Batavia again for the Netherlands. She had VA Bouricius on board, who died during the trip on 4 May. During the trip she was commanded by Captain-lt G. Fabius (son-in-law to Bouricius). On 20 May De Ruyter anchored before the Schelde. On 1 June she was towed into the harbor, effectively ending her career as a sailing ship.

== Conversion to frigate with auxiliary steam power ==
Already in September 1858 there was talk that De Ruyter would be converted to steam in Hellevoetsluis as soon as she returned from the East Indies. In the budget for 1859 there was indeed a sentence about changing De Ruyter in a frigate with 400 hp and 45 guns. The logic is obvious. From August 1857 the Dutch had gained experience with their first frigate with auxiliary power. This was the Wassenaar, she was a successful ship, and a near sister to De Ruyter. This was all the more reason to suppose that a like reconstruction of De Ruyter would be just as successful.

De Ruyter would be decommissioned on 15 June 1859. On 1 June she had been brought into the dock, where she would be stripped of masts, spars and rigging. She would then be towed to Hellevoetsluis, where she would be converted to possess auxiliary steam power. The whole bow and stern of the ship would need to be removed, and the ship lengthened by 25 feet. On 17 August the De Ruyter arrived in Hellevoetsluis towed by the Cycloop. When the bow and the stern of De Ruyter were removed in Hellevoetsluis, not a single piece of rotten wood was found, something ascribed to the good quality of the wood and to the long original construction time (laid down in 1831).

On 18 September 1861 De Ruyter was launched for the second time when Hellevoetsluis Dry Dock was filled with water. She left the dry dock and work continued in Hellevoetsluis. In early October she was towed to Vlissingen by the Cycloop. On 7 October they were in Brouwershaven, and on 8 October before Vlissingen. On 9 October she was towed into the dock. That same month it became known that converting De Ruyter was to cost almost one million guilders, or about seventy-five percent of the cost of building a new frigate.

== Conversion to a casemate ironclad ==
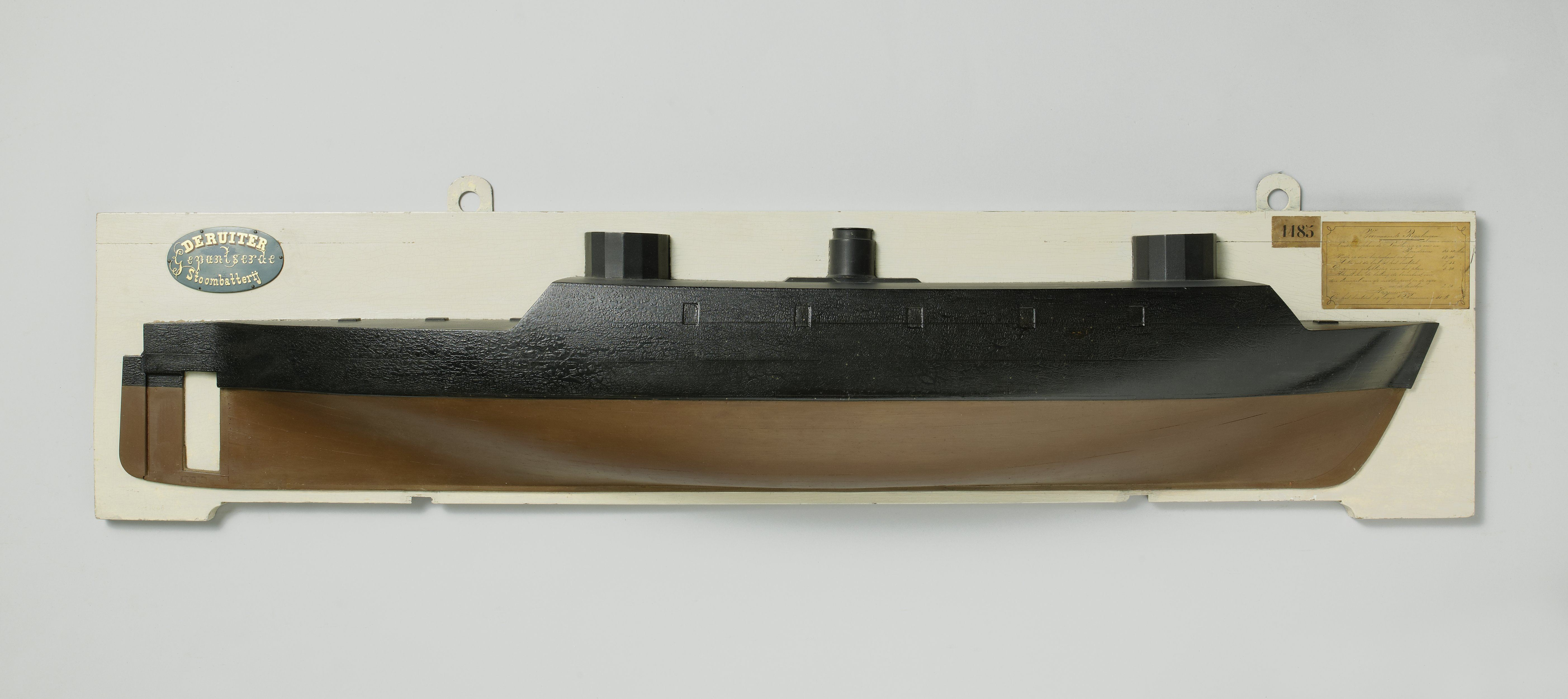
Model of the De Ruyter following conversion into a casemate ironclad

On 8 March 1862 the Battle of Hampton Roads proved that an unarmored frigate did not stand a chance against any armored ship. This was even more the case for frigates like De Ruyter, which had only auxiliary power, and therefore could not run away.

On 9 April a commission was appointed to give an advice about what to do with regard to armoring ships. She advised that none of the existing ships could be made into a seaworthy armored ship. A handful of ships could be transformed for a coastal defense role, among them De Ruyter. In March 1862 De Ruyter was still 200,000 guilders away from getting completed. On the other hand, her transformation to a casemate ironclad would cost 298,000 guilders for the armor plate alone. It was a difficult decision, further complicated by the fact that the Dutch already had other frigates with auxiliary power, by what the national industry could do, and by the wish to have an ironclad as soon as possible. By August 1862 the Rijkswerf Vlissingen was busy removing the upper deck and some of the gun ports.

De Ruyter would later be commissioned as a casemate ironclad into the Royal Netherlands Navy. This took place in 1867, but by then there were newer ships built using better technology, which gave the ship a relatively short service time the ship remained in service until 1874.
