= HNLMS Adolf van Nassau =

Royal Netherlands Navy ship

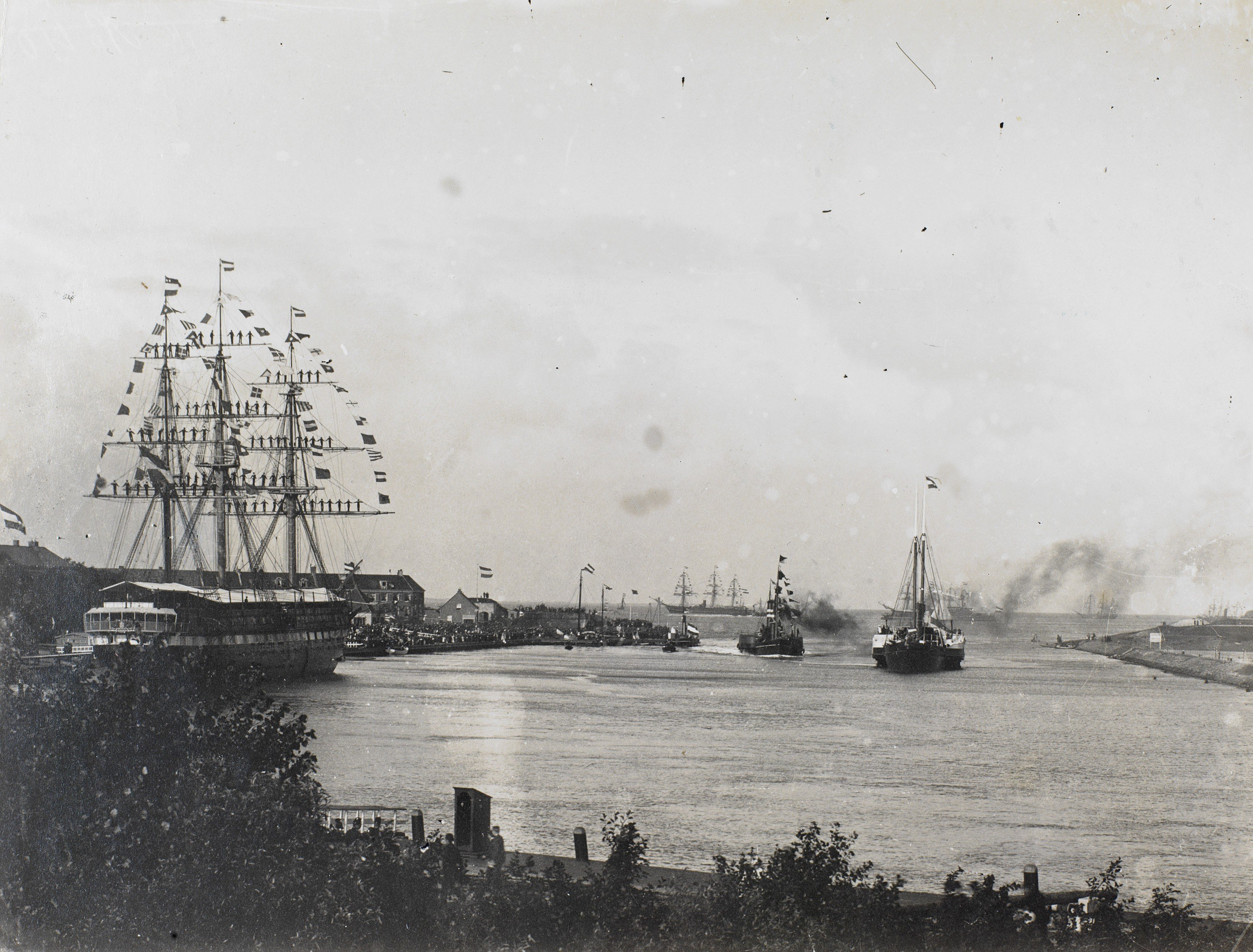
- Adolf van Nassau in Willemsoord in 1894

History

Netherlands
- Name: Adolf van Nassau
- Namesake: Adolf van Nassau
- Builder: Rijkswerf Vlissingen
- Laid down: 4 December 1858
- Launched: 8 June 1861
- Commissioned: 21 August 1864
- Out of service: January 1919

General characteristics (as completed)
- Displacement: 3750t
- Length: 72.86 m (239 ft 1 in)
- Beam: 15.72 m (51 ft 7 in)
- Draft: 6.80 m (22 ft 4 in)
- Installed power: 450 nominal horsepower
- Speed: 9 knots (machines only); 15 kn (machines and sail)
- Armament: 1 * 60-pdr; 26 * 30-pdr Long No 4; 8 * Shell gun 20 cm No 2; 12 * 30-pdr Long No 2; 4 * Shell gun 20 cm No 3
- Armour: none

HNLMS Adolf van Nassau was a unique ship built for the Royal Netherlands Navy.

== Context ==
The Adolf van Nassau was part of the 1855 program that aimed to provide the Netherlands with a balanced fleet of screw propelled warships. The 1855 program called for three types of ships: frigates with auxiliary power of 400 hp; steam corvettes with 250 hp and steam sloops with 100 hp. The reason to create the program were the worries in the house of representatives about the state of the navy. There was a feeling that the navy was creating an enormous variety of ships, that would turn out to be inefficient and ineffective.

The first frigate with auxiliary power was the Wassenaar, a sail frigate converted during construction. The ships of the Evertsen class were laid down in 1854 and 1856 and were designed for auxiliary steam power. Meanwhile, the years between 1845 (acceptance of screw propulsion) and 1862 (Battle of Hampton Roads) were the most revolutionary years in the history of warship construction. The transition from auxiliary steam power to full steam power is a less obvious aspect of these years. In the late 1840s a screw steam frigate that could make 6 knots was superior to any sail-only or paddle-driven warship. A ship with so-called 'full steam power' was something different. It meant that the ship could outrun any ship that was more or less depended on sail.

The Adolf van Nassau would be the fourth frigate of the 1855 program. The major 'flaw' of the Evertsen class in comparison to contemporary foreign frigates was the maximum speed of about 8 knots. Increasing the speed would be a logical design objective.

== Characteristics ==
=== Design ===
The Adolf van Nassau basically seemed to be a lengthened Evertsen class. Her dimensions were the same, except that she was (72.86 - 63.50) 9.36 m longer. This is about 15% longer, and the increased length was no doubt used to install the more powerful steam engine and boilers. The additional space might also have been used for storing 5 months of food and 18 months of other needs.

=== Machinery ===
In April 1861 the machinery for the Adolf of 450 horsepower was ready in the factory of Van Vlissingen en Dudok van Heel. In April 1865 she was reported to have attained a speed of 9 knots under steam, and 15 miles with machines and sail on a hard wind.

=== Sails ===
The Adolf van Nassau was supposed to move by sail most of the time. She therefore had a full sailing apparatus. Her main mast stood 60 meters above the water. The composition of the mast was: mast (the lowest part) of 34.4 m, topmast (Dutch: steng, first extension) 19.5 m, topgallant (Dutch: bramsteng, second extension) 17.15 m, total 71.05 m. The ship being deep (inside the hull) 5.30 m makes this 65.75 m above water. Counting overlap it makes 60 meters. The later unprotected cruiser Atjeh (which had full steam power) had a main mast standing only 38 m above water.

=== Armament ===
Deck	Gun type	Original armament	1873	1876
At the Bow	SBML	1 long 60-pdr on pivot and sled	1 long 60-pdr on pivot and sled	1 long 60-pdr on pivot and sled
Upper deck	SBML	12 long 30-pdr No 1, 2 or 3	12 long 30-pdr No 1, 2 or 3	12 long 30-pdr No 1, 2 or 3
	Shell guns	4 Shell gun 20 cm No3	4 Shell gun 20 cm No3	4 Shell gun 20 cm No3
Main gun deck	SBML	26 long 30-pdr No 4	22 * 16 cm RML, 4 long 30-pdr No 4	8 * 16 cm RML, 18 long 30-pdr No 4
	Shell Guns	8 Shell gun 20 cm No 2	8 Shell gun 20 cm No 2	8 Shell gun 20 cm No 2

From the start the armament of the Adolf van Nassau was given as '51 guns' just like the Evertsen class. Therefore, one can fill in the original armament of 51 guns according to the table in 'Memorandum voor den Jeugdigen Zeeofficier'. This is strange, because the Adolf was 15% longer, and one would therefore expect a longer main battery. That is a stronger main gun deck, even when the total number of guns stays the same.

If one notes that it was 1864 before the Adolf was actually commissioned, this armament was actually fictitious for a very long time. It's not even sure what the actual armament was on her first trip in 1865. There was mention that the Adolf could mount up to 80 guns, which is in line with the number of gun ports on the main deck. In August 1867 she was stated to mount 8 rifled guns, probably in the same configuration as that documented in 1876. In 1873 the armament of the Adolf was stated to be 1 * 60 pdr; 16 * long 30 pdr; 12 * grenade gun 20 cm; 22 * 16 cm RML. Just like the Evertsens. A logical assumption is that the 16 cm RML simply replaced an equal number of long 30 pdr No 4. In the budget for 1876 the Adolf was projected as armed with 1 * 60 pdr; 30 * long 30 pdr; 12 * grenade gun 20 cm; 8 * 16 cm RML.

=== Criticism ===
The active service record of the Adolf van Nassau runs from September 1864 to June 1868, less than 4 years! Her service record did extend to 1874, but from 1868 till 1874 she did not see active service, and lots of money were spent on repairs. However, the mid 1874 decision to end her career does not necessarily reflect her condition, and might have been due to considerations about operational cost in combination with being obsolete.

Therefore, in comparison to foreign ships, serious remarks can be made about the Adolf's speed, armament and quality of construction. The root cause was that as a principal, the Dutch navy also had a role in stimulating the Dutch machine building industry. The navy could also have opted for an older existing steam engine without possible quality issues, or for buying a faster engine from abroad. The key consideration in this respect was that just like having a fleet, having an effective national capacity to build warships was also a cornerstone of national security.

== Construction and Commissioning ==
=== Construction of the Adolf van Nassau ===
The Adolf van Nassau was laid down in Vlissingen on 4 December 1858. In early June 1861 a number of vessels was moved out of the Vlissingen dock to make room for launching the Adolf. She was launched on 8 June 1861. Thus the Adolf had spent only 30 months on the slipway. Compared to the time on the slipway for the Evertsen (35 months), and the Zeeland(41 months), this was very short. The Adolf was also built at a time when the Dutch state shipyards had been too busy (overspanning).

=== Commissioning delayed ===
Both the Evertsen and the Zeeland were commissioned within one year of their launch. In August 1861 the commissioning of the Adolf was said to be postponed to spring 1862., but this would be the regular time to commission her. By October 1861 most of the steam engine and other machinery had been placed on board.

Delays became apparent in spring 1862. In May there was talk about commissioning the Adolf in July. In February of the next year there were rumors that the Adolf would be commissioned for a trip by Prince Alexander to Russia. In July 1863 there was a tender for constructing an iron roof over the Adolf van Nassau. The tender was awarded for 12,300 guilders. The iron roofs over ships in ordinary were becoming a normal construction at the time, though it was remarkable that it was constructed over a ship that had not even sailed yet.

The delay in commissioning the Adolf is explained by two circumstances. The commissioning of the Gloire in August 1860 had basically rendered all existing steam frigates and smaller vessels obsolete. But, this was not yet clear to all. On 8 March 1862 the Battle of Hampton Roads did provide certainty about the use of armor on ships. The Dutch had not done much about armoring, and suddenly realized that they were quite defenseless. Money and men were required for other things than equipping the Adolf. The events in Japan of 1863 and 1864 were the next strain on Dutch naval resources. They also made clear that in many theaters unarmored ships would remain important for some years.

== Service ==
=== First trip ===
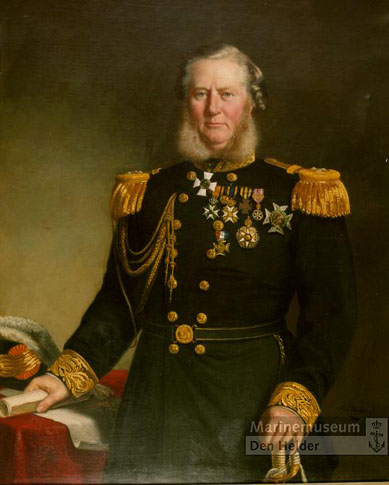
Olke Arnoldus Uhlenbeck (1810-1888) first commander of the Adolf van Nassau

In early July 1864 the Adolf was to be made ready for the East Indies. She was also to transport the director and commander of the navy to Java.

In mid-June another steam frigate, the Zeeland was planned to be refit before her next trip to the East Indies. Her crew was to transfer to the Adolf. On 19 July the Prinses Maria sailed from Nieuwediep to Vlissingen with 100 sailors of the Zeeland, that were to be transferred to the Adolf. On 6 August 100 more of the crew of the Zeeland, that was decommissioning in Nieuwediep, were transferred to the Adolf by ship. Captain S. Faber Huys was to become the first commander of the Adolf, but he retired on 6 August. Captain O.A. Uhlenbeck was immediately appointed to replace him. He was placed in the 'bovenrol' of the Adolf with the date 21 August. On 21 August the Adolf would indeed be commissioned officially.

On 16 September 1864 the Adolf left the dock of Vlissingen and made a short trial on the Schelde. On 29 September the Adolf made a trial run from Vlissingen to Terneuzen. The officer-engineer Juliën was present to inspect the machines. On 15 October 1864 the Adolf finally left Vlissingen.

=== Collision with the merchant ship Gustav ===
On the very first day of her very first voyage the Adolf van Nassau would get in a serious collision with a merchant ship. The ships she collided with was the Swedish Barque Gustav of Captain Berglund, which was sailing from Sundsvall (a center of forestry) to Bristol. On 18 October the Gustav would enter Gravesend without foremast and with other damage.

On 15 October at 22:30 the Adolf was steaming in beautiful weather and a calm sea. On the latitude of South Foreland, she then sighted a Barque without lights coming from the opposite direction. Suddenly, the barque sailed upwind instead of sailing downwind, like a sail ship ought to do in these circumstances. As a consequence both ships collided, sustaining damage to hull and rigging without getting leaky. During the night the Adolf put the Gustav in tow till morning, when an English tugboat offered to pull her to the closest harbor. The Gustav declined this offered and next set sail and disappeared. In the afternoon the warm water tank of the Adolf ripped open, and the engines were stopped. After stopgap repairs the Adolf sailed to the Downs. In the Downs repairs to the machinery continued day and night till the morning of Wednesday (the 19th). The Adolf then sailed to Sheerness, where she entered the dry dock on Thursday 27 October. The damage would be repaired in a few days.

The above was a story published on 2 November. On 19 October, there was a rumor in Vlissingen that the Adolf had been sighted with a broken 'kluiverboom' Jibboom (an extension of the bowsprit), and broken 'voorbramsteng' (second extension of the fore-mast). The Adolf was reported as leaving Deal for Sheerness on 19 October. On 21 October L.K. Turk, director of naval construction in Nieuwediep, left Nieuwediep to assess the damage, and to see where it should be repaired. On 21 October the Adolf anchored in the Nore with 'a lost voorbramsteng, broken bowsprit and other damage to ship and machinery'. Later on the 21st the Adolf, after exchanging salutes, sailed up the Medway to be repaired in one of the docks.

Next a dramatized account of the affair started to circulate in the press: After sailing under very good conditions during the day and part of the night, the whole crew was suddenly awakened at about half past eleven by a terrible shock that threw everything in chaos. Coming on the deck a big ship was seen square on the bow, while desperate cries were heard between loud cracking. Meanwhile, the crew of the ship that later became known to be a Swedish barque loaded with wood, had transferred to the Adolf. All then tried to separate the ships. The Gustav had a broken mizzen mast, and it was only her cargo that saved her from sinking immediately. On investigation the Adolf turned out to be damaged severely. Her bowsprit had been torn off with all attached rigging, part of the bow had been broken off and was displaced. The barque was put in tow, and in the morning she was cut loose, so she could float to the Downs before the wind. The Adolf then tried to steam to Portsmouth, but at about noon (on the 16th) the warm water tank ripped open, so neither sailing nor steaming was possible. Day and night the machine crew, so often maligned by the officers, worked to repair the slit as well as possible, fearing the increasing force of the wind. In the evening the Adolf could finally steam again, but with the engine room full of warm water. Power was not enough to steam upwind, and so the Adolf had to take a course backward to the Downs, in order to repair the machine so it could steam to Sheerness to inspect and repair the ship.

Next to the dramatized account there were false accounts that the Adolf would have to return to the Netherlands for repairs or would be in repair for two months. A probable source for these was the confusion between jibboom and bowsprit. The Adolf had been sighted with a broken jibboom, but she was reported with a 'broken bowsprit' when she on anchored in the Nore. A broken bowsprit fits the dramatized account. Anyhow it all forced the Dutch government to react. It announced that a report by Uhlenbeck stated that the damage to hull, rigging and steam engines was not so significant as had first been suspected. The bowsprit did not have to be replaced. The Adolf had been placed in a dry dock, and was expected to be able to leave the dock again by the next spring tide in mid-November. The above report published on 2 November also explicitly states that it was written to counter the dramatized report. It said that repairs would be finished in a few days and denied that the sailors had worked day and night in a machineroom full of warm water, that there was a shock, shouting, or even that sleeping had been woke by the collision. On Thursday 10 November the Adolf left the dry dock, but repairs were expected to take two more weeks. On 18 November all damage had been repaired.

On 19 November 1864 the Adolf left Sheerness. On 30 December she reached Rio de Janeiro after facing much bad weather. The visit to Rio de Janeiro was made to strengthen ties with Brazil. The help that the Corvette Amelia had previously received in Brazil was taken as a pretext. Several gifts and decorations were sent and the Adolf was visited by the Emperor of Brazil and the secretary for the navy. On 19 January the Adolf left Rio. On 17 March 1865 the Adolf anchored before Batavia. In mid April she was fitting out at Onrust. She also exchanged a big part of her crew for 200 men that were destined to return to the Netherlands.

=== Home voyage 1865 ===
On 9 May 1865 Adolf van Nassau left Batavia again. On 9 June she anchored in Simon's Town near Cape Town. On 17 June she celebrated the birthday of the queen with salutes and a dinner, and then left for Vlissingen. On 15 August Adolf reached Texel and entered Nieuwediep. On board were 600 men, many of them returning on leave, or declared unfit for further service. There were 49 sick on board, 1 patient had been left in Simon's Town, and 2 people had died during the trip. On board were also 11 prisoners and 6 Colonists who had failed to succeed on the Cape. Adolf brought 7 guns and 1 field gun captured from the Japanese in the Shimonoseki campaign.

=== Machinery trouble ===
On 22 August 1865 a commission headed by Inspector Huygens inspected the machinery of the Adolf. It criticized the metals used in the machinery, which had been the cause of defects on the trip to and from Batavia. By 7 October a Japanese Officer-Engineer and a Japanese officer had arrived in Nieuwediep. They would stay there a few months to witness the placement and calibration of the machines of the Adolf. By 17 November the news was that the repairs on the Adolf would take the rest of the year. By 10 December the news was that the machinery required huge and costly repairs making that she would only be ready by mid January. Despite rumors that repairs had failed, the Adolf made a trial run for the machines on 12 January 1866. The results were reported as good, but the Adolf would wait another two weeks before sailing out.

=== The Independencia ===
The Chincha Islands War between Spain, Chile and Peru would cross the 1866 plans for the Adolf van Nassau. The plans were that she would make a cruise to Istanbul and other places in the Mediterranean. In January she was redirected to Vlissingen. On 31 January 1866 the Adolf seemed to have left for Vlissingen, but it was 2 February before she did. On 4 February she reached Vlissingen and then immediately continued to Terneuzen in company of the screw schooner Frans Naerebout.

The Peruvian ironclad Independencia was fitting out in Terneuzen. She had been built in England, but because Spain was at war with Peru, she would be in danger of getting seized if she remained in England. She had therefore sailed to Terneuzen with crew and workmen still on board. In Terneuzen there would be relatively few people watching her, and the Dutch did not have any ship that could sink her. The Dutch were obliged to seize or expel her, and so the Adolf was to press the Dutch orders to leave. Actually she could not do anything against the armored ship, which also had rifled guns. Therefore her orders were to limit the communications of the Independencia with Terneuzen to the daily necessities. Meanwhile the situation got so serious that the coastal artillery in Zeeland was mobilised, and the floating battery De Ruyter was called to the scene. On 14 February the Adolf anchored before Vlissingen, the news was that guarding the Independencia was not necessary because there was no official declaration of war between Spain and Peru. On 19 February the Independencia left Zeeland for open sea.

=== First Mediterranean cruise ===
On 27 February 1866 Adolf van Nassau was inspected in Vlissingen . On 1 March she left Vlissingen for the Mediterranean. On 3 March she passed Wight. On 18 March she reached Malta, from whence she left on the 24th. On 29 March she anchored in the bay of Smyrna. A letter from there noted that the English ships seen at Malta were generally better than Dutch ships, and in particular better than Adolf. The explanation was that the English stayed on their ship 3-4 or even more years. Adolf had changed most of its crew three times in the 1.5 year that she had served. On 10 April Adolf reached Piraeus. Here the officers joined the celebration of the independence at court. On 17 April she left Piraeus for Salamis, a place widely known as very convenient to exercise with artillery and hand weapons.

On 30 April 1866 Adolf reached Naples. She would stay there for two weeks for many repairs to the axle of the propeller. On 11 May she got orders to return to the Netherlands without visiting other places in the Mediterranean. On 11 June she anchored in Lisbon to take in fresh water, because the distilling machines were not functioning. By 19 June these had been repaired, and the promotion of Captain Uhlenbeck to Rear Admiral was known. He would also become director and commander of the navy at Willemsoord on 1 August. On 20 June Adolf left Lisbon and on 5 July she reached Texel.

=== Second Mediterranean cruise ===
On 6 July Captain G.P.J. Mossel took up command of the Adolf. There were plans for the Adolf and the corvette van Speijk to start another cruise to the Mediterranean by mid October. Rumors that repairs to the machinery would delay the trip proved false, and on 20 October the Adolf left Nieuwediep. The voyage was to be a training course that would last 5 months. The Adolf was to visit Gibraltar, Mahon, Toulon, Genoa, Malta and on 15 March Cadiz. The return to Texel would be on 15 April. On 11 November the Adolf was at Gibraltar. After spending three days in Quarantine, she left for Mahon on the 14th. On the 23rd she reached Mahon. On 4 December the Adolf reached Toulon. Here she probably met the Van Speijk, which left Toulon for Genoa on the 18th. The Adolf followed on 19 December. On 25 December both arrived in Genoa. On 12 January 1867 the Adolf arrived in Naples, and on 19 January the Van Speijk. On 12 February she entered the harbor of Malta, where the Van Speijk had arrived three days before. On 20 February the Adolf and Van Speijk left Malta for Texel due to a telegram from The Hague. On 11 March the Adolf arrived in Gibraltar, and left there the 14th. The Van Speijk arrived there on 15 March and left on the 16th. On 30 March the Van Speijk arrived in Texel. On 1 April the Adolf arrived back on the Texel roadstead. In late April the news was that the Adolf would be repaired while her crew would be put on the sailing frigate Holland. In late May these were called 'some repairs'. On 27 May 1867 the Adolf van Nassau entered Dry Dock II in Willemsoord with all her guns on board.

=== Squadron to Edinburgh ===
The next plan was for the Adolf, Curaçao and Zoutman to make a short trip to Edinburgh starting 1 July. Captain J.E. de Man was appointed as next commander with date 6 July. By 5 July the plan was to make a squadron on the 15th consisting of the Adolf as flagship, the ram turret Prins Hendrik, the screw corvettes Zoutman, Curaçao and Metalen Kruis and the steam peddler Valk. The departure of the squadron was delayed by bad weather. On 21 July a squadron consisting of the Adolf under captain and overall commander J.E. de Man and the corvettes Metalen Kruis, Zoutman and Curaçao left Texel for the North Sea. On 12 August the squadron anchored in the Firth of Forth. The Scotsman of 14 August gave many details of the visit. On 24 Augustus the squadron arrived back in Nieuwediep. On 31 August Prince Henry of the Netherlands (1820–1879) arrived in Willemsoord. He embarked on the recently arrived ironclad Prins Hendrik der Nederlanden, and with her steamed to the Adolf, which he visited. The trip to Edinburgh and the royal visit were subject of drawings and paintings.

=== Third Mediterranean cruise ===
On 10 November 1867 the Adolf anchored in Texel, and on 11 November she left Texel for another trip to the Mediterranean. On 12 November she was sailing near Dungeness (headland). On 3 December she reached Gibraltar. On 16 December she left again, and on 23 December she reached Barcelona. En route from Barcelona to Toulon the Adolf took refuge from a storm in the harbor of Mahon on 8 January. She had much damage to sails and boats. On 8 February she reached Toulon. The planned expedition was then interrupted, and on 29 February the Adolf left Toulon for Lisbon. On 8 April she passed Dungeness. She seemed to have reversed course then. On 12 April the Adolf entered Portsmouth and on 18 April she left there to arrive in Spithhead the same day. While there the captain and officers visited multiple sites. On 23 April the Adolf anchored in Texel, and on the next day she entered Nieuwediep.

In late April there was a rumor that the Adolf's commander J.E. de Man was a possible candidate for Secretary of the Navy. On 30 June 1868 the Adolf and the Metalen Kruis were decommissioned. However impressive the Adolf might have appeared in her recent travels, the actual value that the Dutch attached to the Adolf was shown during the mobilization of 1870. In July 1870 the Dutch navy had her armored ships ready but held the four newest steam frigates in reserve. The Adolf was put in repair, but the attention given to armored ships did not allow to press these repairs. By late October 1872 a raise in the naval budget included money for the final repairs on the machinery of the Adolf, which was not yet installed on board.

== Guard ship in Willemsoord ==
In mid 1874 the new Secretary for the Navy Van Erp Taalman Kip stated that he thought that it was not sensible to (further) repair the Adolf, but that she could serve as Guard ship in Willemsoord. In September 1876 the Adolf was being changed to a guard ship in Willemsoord, where it would replace the Kortenaer. On 21 April 1879 the Adolf was commissioned as guard ship. Her engines had been removed, and her armament consisted of 4 12 cm breach loaders and 8 medium 30-pounders. In Dutch she was now called a 'Wachtschip'. A 'wachtschip' was something more than a barracks ship, because it had a regular commander, in case of the Adolf a captain, and flew the flag of the commander of the base.

Her place was near the mouth of the Nieuwediep, even somewhat closer to sea than the Willemsoord dock itself. This means she was captured on many photographs, and was occasionally hit by passing ships. In early October 1881 the English steamer Telesilla hit her, damaging the stern. On 20 August 1882 the steamer Trevethick caused some damage.

== Decommissioning ==
In 1913 plans were made to decommission and sell the Adolf van Nassau in 1914. As a consequence 60,000 guilders were requested to enlarge and change the marines barracks, and 25,000 was asked for a wireless communication post in and on the commanders building in Willemsoord, because this had been on board the Adolf with her long mast. In August 1915 the works on the barracks were still ongoing.

On 27 February 1918 the Adolf van Nassau was decommissioned as guard ship and replaced as such by the barracks ship (logementschip) Neptunus (ex-Evertsen). She was next used as barracks for the army. She was moved to the dock of Willemsoord. While there she suddenly got leaky and sunk in June 1918. She was pumped dry, but her days had been numbered. In January 1919 the Adolf was to be sold. In April 1919 she was sold to the Community of Den Helder, that would distribute her remains as firewood to her population.
