= French flush-cut saw =

A French flush-cut saw is a double-edged tool, similar to a veneer saw, that is designed for trimming the ends of dowels, tenons, and other protrusions flush with a surface. The blade usually has 11 teeth per inch on one side, and 20 teeth per inch on the other side, making it more versatile than other flush-cutting saws. The blade is approximately 6 inches long, and in order to avoid marring the surface, the saw teeth are angled slightly upward.
