= Van Vlissingen and Co. =

American real estate developer

Van Vlissingen and Company
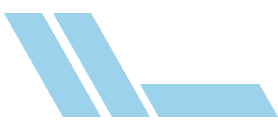
- Type: Private company
- Industry: Real estate
- Founded: 1879; 147 years ago
- Founders: James H. Vlissingen and Arthur H. Van Vlissingen
- Headquarters: Lincolnshire, Illinois, USA
- Area served: Northern Illinois
- Key people: President & CEO; Charles R. Lamphere,
- Services: Facility management Real estate development Leasing
- Website: www.vvco.com

Van Vlissingen and Co., founded in 1879, are a privately held full-service commercial and industrial real estate developer, broker, asset and property manager.

Van Vlissingen and Co. developed the Roseland and Pullman communities in 19th century Chicago, and established the Van Vlissingen Plan that created the Port of Chicago, the Wrigley Building, and Chicago's modern lakefront. In the 1980s and 1990s, Van Vlissingen and Co. developed, leased, and managed innovative office, industrial, flex, and technology parks in Lincolnshire, Vernon Hills and Buffalo Grove, Illinois.

== 19th-Century historical origins ==
James H. and Arthur H. Van Vlissingen, Dutch Immigrants, moved to Roseland from Spykenisse, Holland, after the American Civil War. After James H. Van Vlissingen achieved success as a Chicago real estate broker and developer in 1879, the Van Vlissingen brothers founded Van Vlissingen and Co., establishing offices in both Roseland and Chicago. Arthur took charge of the offices in Roseland and gained a reputation as a savvy commercial real estate developer and a marketer.

Seeing promising industrial development opportunities, the Van Vlissingen brother acquired vast tracts of land around the south side of Chicago. Starting with a 400-acre industrial development in Roseland, Van Vlissingen and Co. reshaped the Chicago's south side, confining available farmland to western Chicago and areas east of the Illinois railroad tracks. The Van Vlissingen development in Roseland, in tandem with George M. Pullman, transformed Roseland from a predominantly Dutch American farming community into an industrialized multi ethnic boomtown.

During the 1880s, the Van Vlissingen family worked to transform their industrial holdings and real estate business. Arthur H. Van Vlissingen garnered a reputation as major deal maker and "city slicker." Working with the Pullman Company, Van Vlissingen and Co. attempted to create industrial developments distinct from the jungle of industry on the south side of Chicago. Van Vlissingen and Co. worked to develop the Pullman neighborhood in contrast to its "poor, smelly, noisy, and dingy neighbors" and develop a balanced cosmopolitan industrial district. As the leading real estate developer in the area, Van Vlissingen and Co. worked painstakingly to ensure that Pullman was viewed favorably by industrialists, merchants, politicians, and workers. Developing and brokering large scale real estate transactions during the Gilded Age, the Van Vlissingen family amassed a small fortune and transformed the South Side of Chicago riding the wave of post American Civil War industrialization.

== Early 20th Century Chicago Developments ==
The Van Vlissingen family, grew to significant wealth and prominence in rapidly industrializing Chicago. James H. Van Vlissingen became known as one of Chicago's most active industrial promoters. In the early twentieth century James H. Van Vlissingen and Van Vlissingen and Co. became one of Chicago's leaders in locating, subdividing, and planning large scale industrial developments.

By 1920 as Roseland, Pullman, districts along the canal, the southern part of the Chicago River and the near South Side of Chicago had already been developed, Van Vlissingen and Co. looked for other industrial development opportunities. Since its founding the City of Chicago lacked an easily navigable port for large vessels. As the metropolitan area continued to rapidly industrialize, the need for safe and functional maritime transportation became even more apparent. Seeing an incredible development opportunity, Van Vlissingen and Co. began laying plans to redevelop the Chicago lake front, construct a functional port, warehousing, and a transportation hub at Calumet City.

On June 29, 1920, Arend Van Vlissingen submitted to the Council Committee on Harbors, Waves, and Bridges a "Report on a Plan for the Construction of a Harbor at Lake Calumet and on the Public Need of Such a Harbor." The Van Vlissingen plan outlined the dredging and establishment of Lake Calumet Harbor, the development of the Wrigley Building and reshaping of the Chicago Waterfront. The Plan, became the official waterfront plan for the City of Chicago and was turned into the Lake Calumet Harbor Act by the Illinois State Legislature in 1921.

In the late 1920s and up until the Second World War, all of Chicago's major industrial development firms grew northward to exploit large untapped available tracts of land. Van Vlissingen and Co. also moved its operations to Cook County's north side to adjust to the changing truck based industrial transportation economy.

== Post War Northern Illinois Industrial Developments ==
After the death of James H. Van Vlissingen in 1938 and his grandson Lt. Robert N. Winslow Jr. in World War II; Van Vlissingen and Co. had devolved into a 4 employee company. Seeing an opportunity to expand Van Vlissingen and Co.'s rich history of development and brokerage Karl H. Schildgen purchased the business in 1948. Following in the footsteps of the founding Van Vlissingen brothers Karl looked for open space for industrial developments in Cook County.

Capitalizing on the expansion of suburban Chicago in the 1950s, 1960s, and 1970s, Karl H. Schilgen expanded Van Vlissingen's development and real estate portfolio. Van Vlissingen and Co.'s continued to be a major industrial real estate pioneer and economic community builder in Northern Cook County. Teaming up with his son in law, Robert G. Lamphere, in the 1960s Van Vlissingen and Co. developed Palatine Expressway Industrial Park, managed the expansion of the Oak Forest Industrial Park, and Northgate Industrial Park in Wheeling.

== Office, industrial and technology parks 1980 to today ==
Evolving with the times, Van Vlissingen and Co. in the 1980s expanded its portfolio of developments, brokerage, and holdings into technology and office space. Understanding the role that psychology and design play in creating happy and productive work environments Van Vlissingen and Co. spent millions to build sunken, curving streets and jogging paths to foster the ideal modern work environment. Additionally, the developers worked to maximize employee health, fitness, and mental well-being; creating fitness centers, weekly concerts and green spaces in their office and industrial parks. Just like the Pullman development in the 19th century, Van Vlissingen and Co.'s focus was on developing a work environment to keep employees happy, because a happy community has more productive employees.

Partnering with several major technology firms, Volkswagen, and the Illinois Department of Commerce, in 1982 Van Vlissingen and Co. opened the Lincolnshire Corporate Center in Lincolnshire, Illinois. Lincolnshire Corporate Center vastly expanded the economic base of South Lake County, and helped Lincolnshire emerge as a center for corporate growth in the Midwest. Pioneers to Lincolnshire, Van Vlissingen and Co's presence in Lake County fueled a boom of both industrial and office development in the Chicago Suburbs. Expanding on the Lincolnshire Corporate Center in 1983 Van Vlissingen and Co. began construction on the Corporate Grove a $100 million office and technology park in Buffalo Grove. As a result of the 200 acre Corporate Grove development, 30 new businesses came to Buffalo Grove along with thousands of new families. Striving to continually grow, Van Vlissingen and Co. developed the Corporate Woods in Vernon Hills, Illinois. Into the late 1980s and 1990s, the industrial and office boom continued in South Lake County.

Van Vlissingen and Co. in 2017 evolved and expanded its portfolio into north and west Lake County and the surrounding Chicago collar counties. Van Vlissingen and Co. in 2018 redeveloped their office parks to bring city amenities to the suburbs.
