= Royal flush =

Royal Flush may refer to:

== Card games ==
- Royal flush (poker hand), an ace-high straight flush
- Royal Flush (game), a solitaire card game

== Music ==
- Royal Flush (rapper) (Ramel Govantes, born 1977), an American rapper
- Royal Flush (album), a 1962 album by jazz trumpeter Donald Byrd
- "Royal Flush" (song), a 2008 song by OutKast's Big Boi
- Royal Flush, a 2010 mixtape by Cyhi the Prynce

== Other uses ==
- Royal Flush (magazine), American humor magazine
- "Royal Flush" (Monkees episode), the first episode of The Monkees
- Royal Flush (novel), a 1932 novel by Margaret Irwin
- "A Royal Flush", an Only Fools and Horses Christmas TV special
- Operation Royal Flush, a military deception in Second World War

== See also ==
- Fess Williams and his Royal Flush Orchestra, a jazz band led by Fess Williams from 1926 to 1930
- Royal Flush Gang, fictional characters from DC comics
