= Vlissingen Naval Base =

Dutch naval base

- Marine etablissement Vlissingen
- Vlissingen, Zeeland in Netherlands
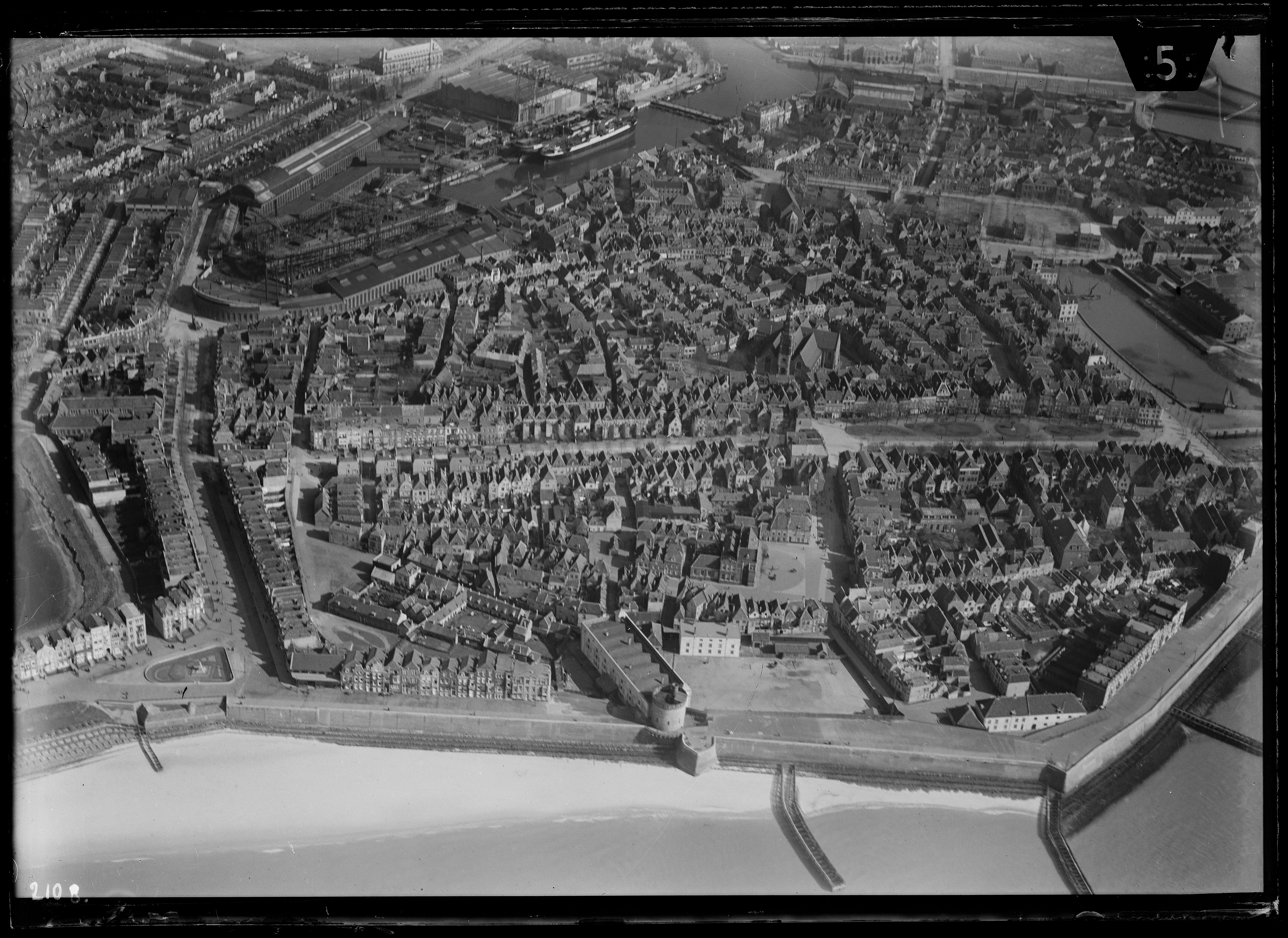
- An aerial photograph of Vlissingen, viewed from the west, naval facilities at the top of the photo.

Site information
- Type: Naval base
- Owner: Zeeland municipality
- Operator: Royal Netherlands Navy (former)
- Open to the public: Yes open terrain
- Condition: Defunct

Location
- Location within Zeeland
- Coordinates: 51.444052°N 3.582191°E

Site history
- Built: 1687
- In use: 16th century–present
- Battles/wars: Walcheren Campaign (1809)

Vlissingen Naval Base (Dutch: Marine Etablissement Vlissingen) was a base for the Admiralty of Zeeland, and later the Dutch Navy. It has a number of major marine facilities of historic significance. It housed a shipyard for the Admiralty of Zeeland, and the national shipyard Rijkswerf Zeeland. Shipyard de Schelde would take over the grounds of the Rijkwerf, and still continues to build warships as Damen Schelde Naval Shipbuilding.

== Location of Vlissingen ==
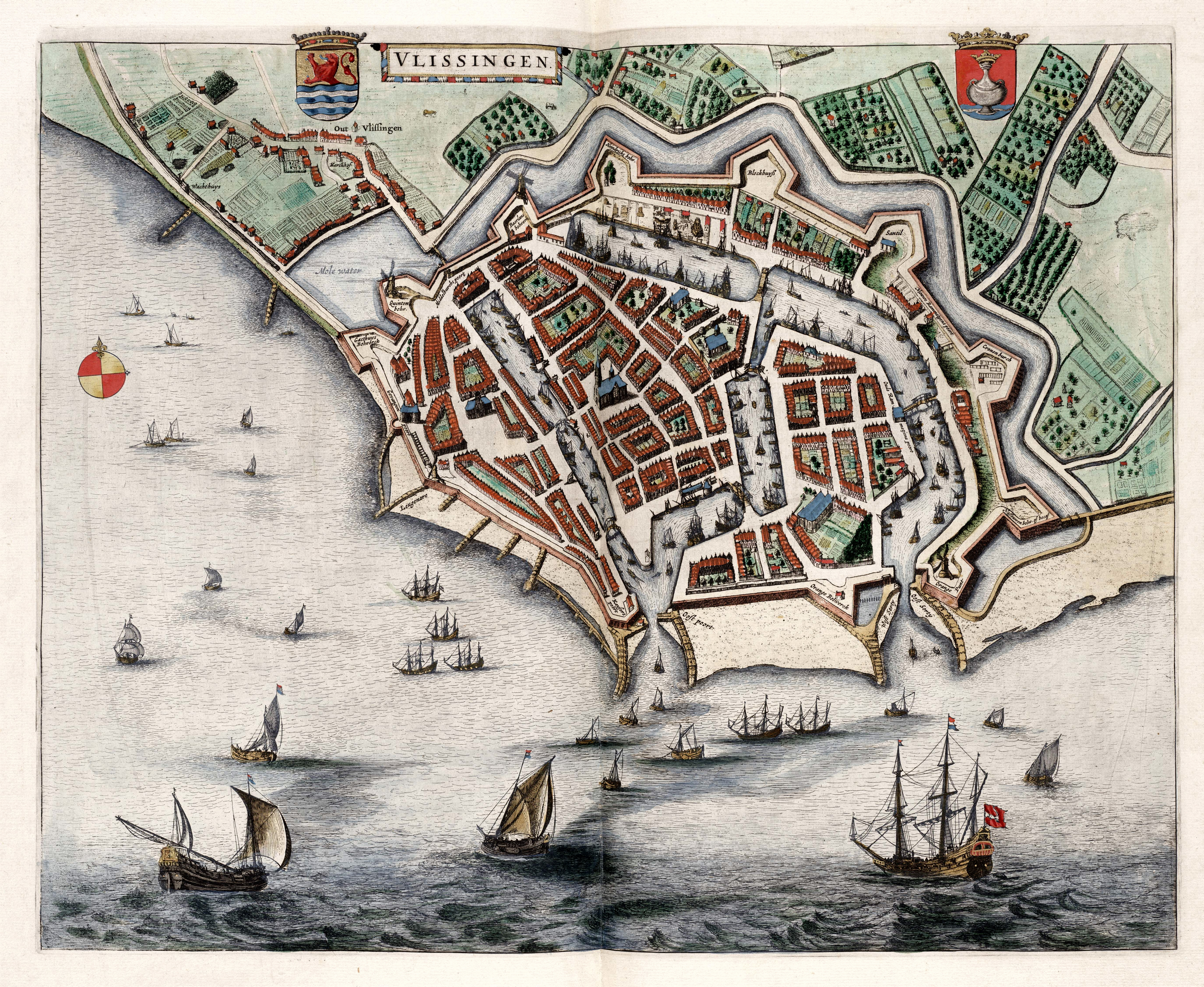
Vlissingen in 1649 before the current dock was made. It also shows the Sasbrug and the extent of the first dock

The location of Vlissingen on the mouth of the Schelde means that it can easily be reached by the biggest ships. Such was the case in the Middle Ages and this is still the case in the 21st century. What made Vlissingen a safe place for ships were the man-made facilities of the port. Large numbers of warships could lay in ordinary in the wet dock, and then be repaired either in the dry dock or on one of the slips of the Rijkswerf.

== Facilities of the naval base at Vlissingen ==
=== The Oosterhaven, the first dock ===
The city walls of Vlissingen were expanded in the early seventeenth century. This brought some defensive canals inside the city walls and made room for a large harbor. From 1609 to 1614 an area roughly corresponding to the current dock and the now disappeared sea lock was dug out. Just north of the place of the later dry dock there was a sea lock with a bridge over it, the Sasbrugge. It explains why the city magistrates were already referring to a wet dock or 'Dokke', before the present dock was made. East of the Sasbrugge the new Oosterhaven was an open tidal harbour. It was also called 'herberghe' a big harbor that was not perfect, but was a safe place from storm and moving ice in winter.

The new harbor was not finished by simply digging out some ground. In 1622 the city decided to make a quay of 115 meter, which would become the Houtkade, with the Dishoeckhuis. In 1628 the continuation of this quay to the Sasbrug was ordered. And in 1629 the quay of the Peperdijk was ordered. The lock below the Sasbrug did not function well, and there were also problems with the dock. Ships were on the ground, and could not be put on their sides to careen them. It seems these problems brought about the ideas for a bigger and better wet dock for the fleet of the Dutch Republic.

=== The dock ===
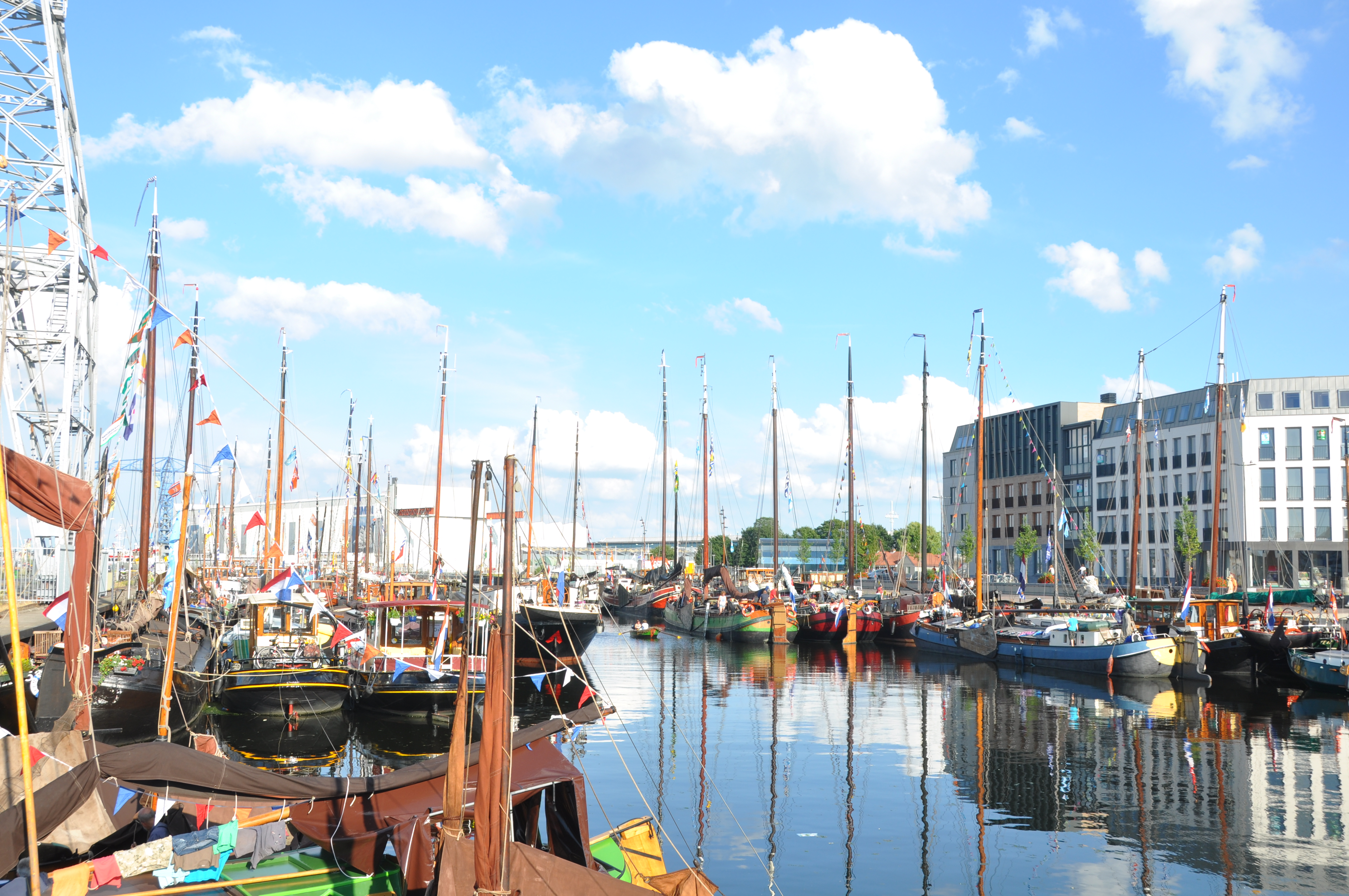
Dock of Vlissingen in 2013

In 1687 Stadtholder William III sent a letter to the States General requesting approval for the Zeeland Admiralty to create a suitable dock for the ships of the republic, that would otherwise completely decay. The city government had some reservations, especially about the removal of some private shipyards that had been founded around the existing dock. After threats that the dock would otherwise be made in Veere, the city agreed in April 1688. The council soon after also gave permission to demolish the old Rammekenspoort, that was obviously in the way.

The new and much larger wet dock was started in 1687 and finished in 1693, the total cost became 598,000 guilders. It consisted of a much wider and deeper stretch of water closed off by a sea lock. Near the end it was a bit shorter than the previous dock. The old Sasbrug was removed and replaced by a floating bridge in 1694. A big fleet could stay inside this dock, safe from enemies, storm, tides, and always with enough water below the keel. In times of peace this was perhaps just as important as during war, because then most ships would lay in ordinary. It meant that most of the masts, rigging and equipment were removed and only minimal maintenance was done. One can imagine that such a ship moved by the tides and hitting bottom now and then is damaged and decays much quicker than a ship lying in almost still water. The dock would regularly have to be dug out. In 1810 the French dug out the dock to 4.7 m below low tide.

=== The Sea Lock ===
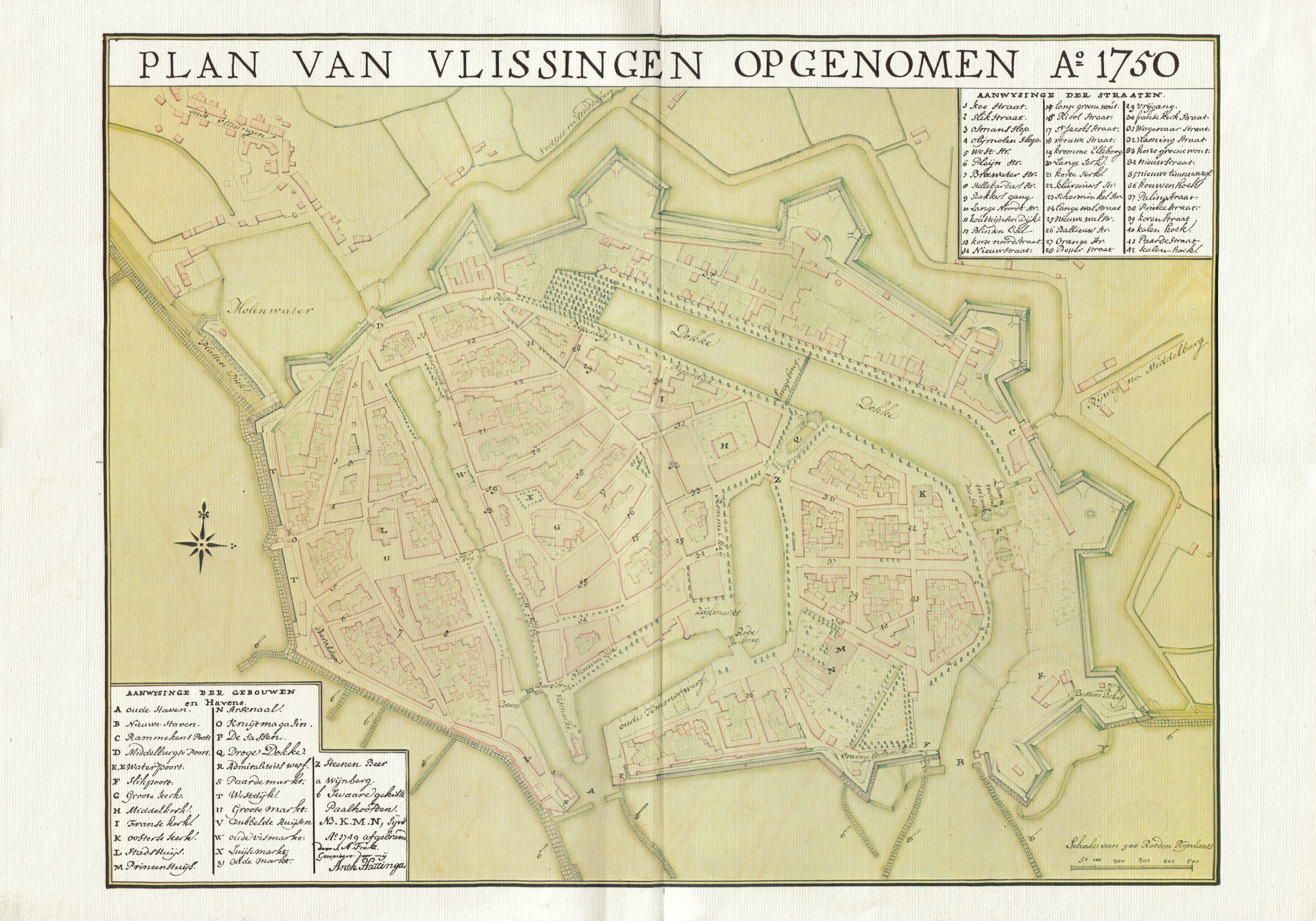
1750 map with dams for repairing the sea lock

The sea lock was a major technical challenge because of its proximity to the sea, and the very unstable underground. The foundations were repeatedly destroyed by movements in the ground, the naval shipworm and water rising up below the foundations. In 1744 the first sea-lock became defunct.

In order to build a new sea lock dams were made on both sides of the existing lock. A new lock was built from 1745 - 1753. It was almost 39.30 m long, 14.60 wide, and deep 2.5 m below low tide. It was a very solid construction, because it would take almost 30 years before significant repairs were necessary. Even then the repairs were probably only the doors.

In 1806 the French widened the upper part of the sea lock to 17.5 m, a creative act, but it did not lead to a properly functioning lock. In 1810 the French lengthened the lock to 46.22 m, it became 17.5 m wide overall and was made deeper by a dangerous construction. On the other hand, the costly work was already finished in 1812. In 1833 some wooden parts of the lock were found floating in the water. In 1834 the situation was investigated. It led to provisional repairs in 1834–1835. In the early 1840s repairs were made by diving bell and candle-light. From 1847 till November 1848 the lock was made dry and thorough repairs were made on the sea-side of the lock for a cost of 243,000 guilders.

=== The Dry Dock ===
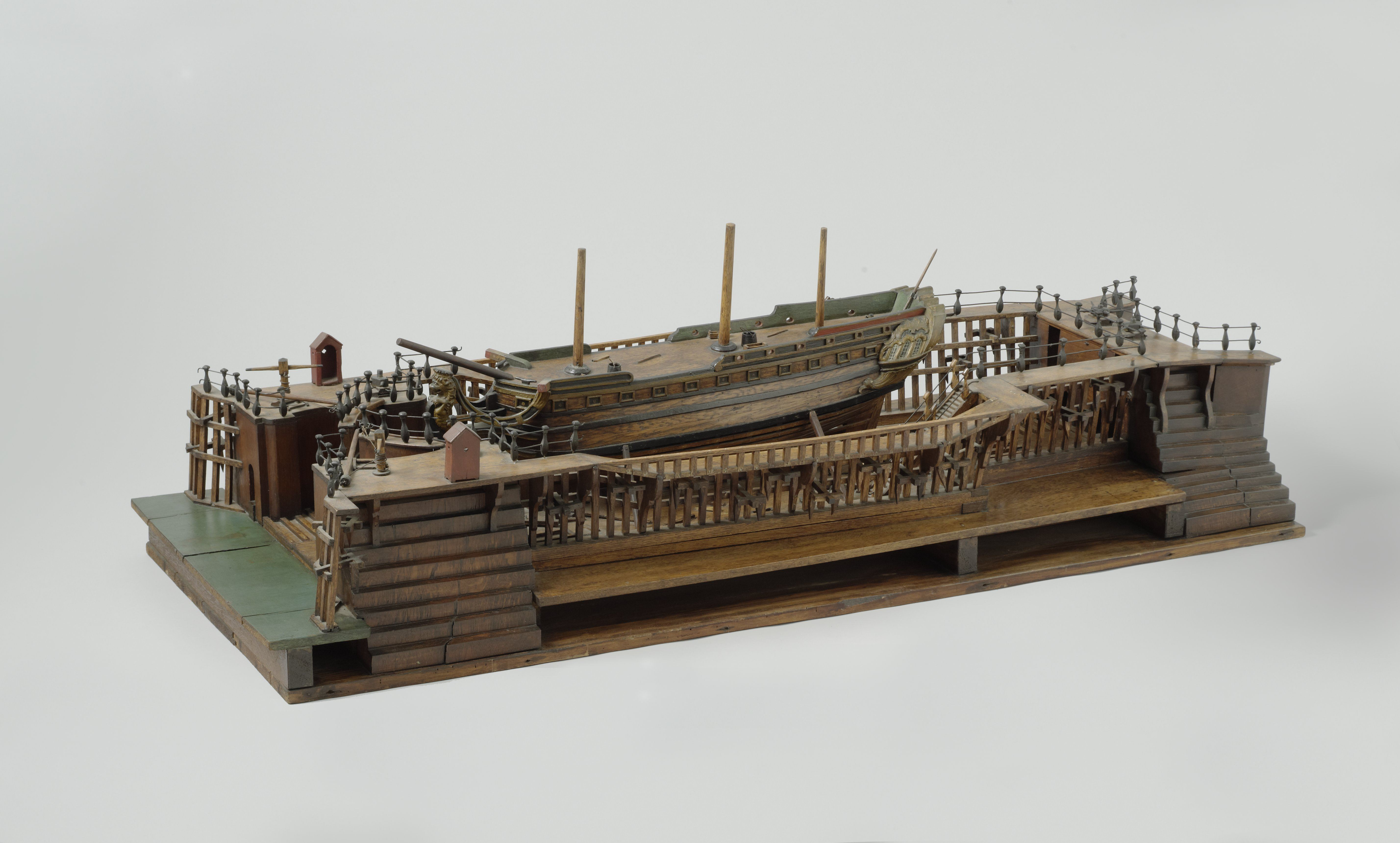
Model of Vlissingen dry dock in 1783

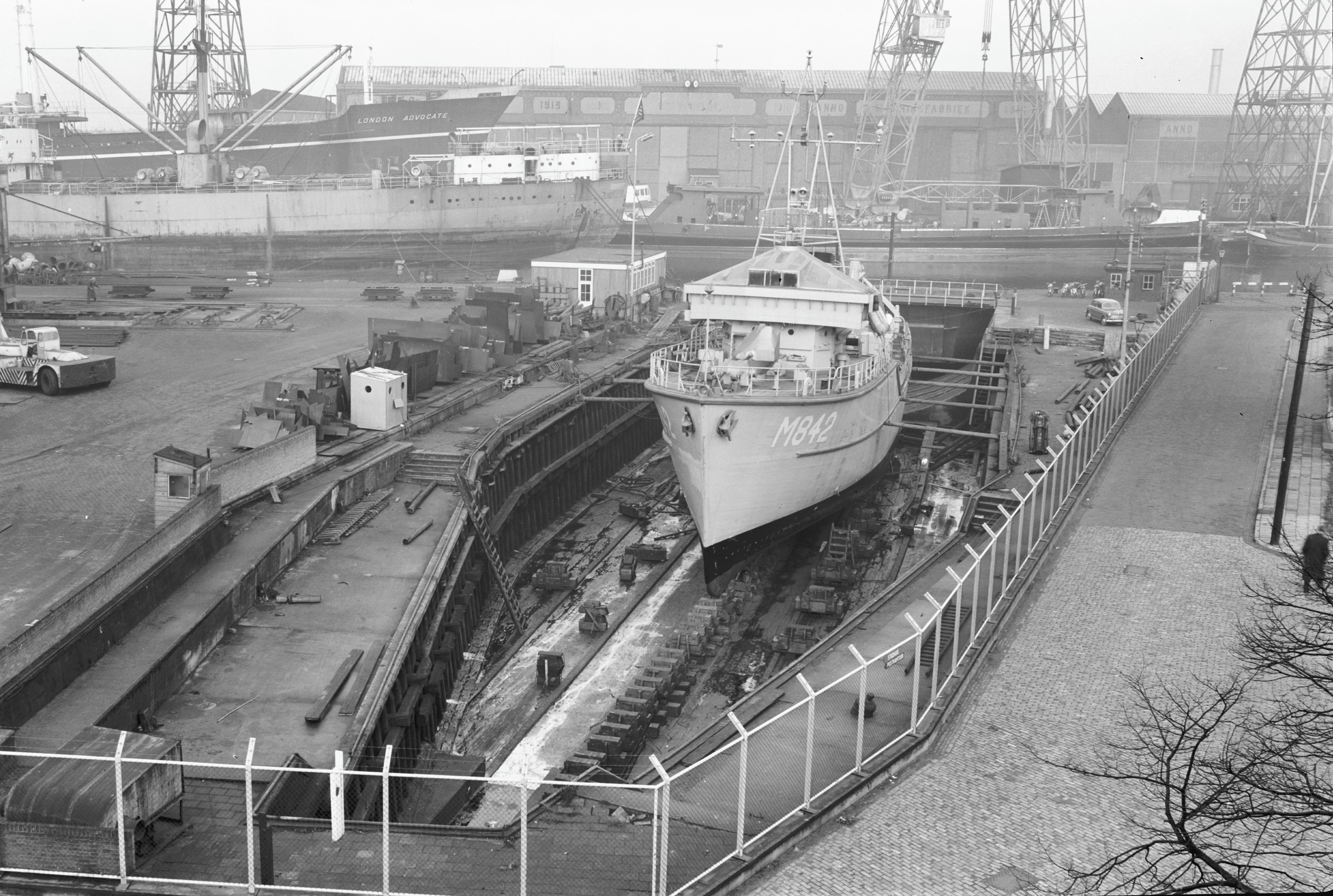
Perry's dry dock in 1964

The first dry-dock of the Netherlands was built adjacent to the dock from 1704 to 1705, at a cost of 37,000 guilders It was nicknamed 'Perry's dokje' after Captain John Perry who designed it in 1697. Perry (1670-1733) was an engineer later known for his book The State of Russia under the Present Czar (1716) and other works. The curious location of the dock between two bodies of water has to do with the constant water level in the dock. The traditional way to empty a dry dock was to put a ship in at high tide, and then to get rid of most of the water by letting it flow out at low tide. Of course the latter could not be done on the dock side. The dry dock has a ship shaped form in order to lessen the amount of remaining water that had to be pumped out. The pumps were driven by a horse-mill.

The main problem of the dry dock that engineers were not able to keep the water from the dock out of the dry dock. The solution for making a waterproof lock gate for a dry dock was the caisson or ship-door invented in France in 1683, but this solution was not applied. In 1737 an amount of water suddenly welled up near the doors, and in 1738 the same happened on the other side. There were some repairs, but these were not completely effective. The naval shipworm also played its part, and from 1737 to 1745 the dry dock gradually fell into disrepair. After that it would not function for decades. The need for a dry dock was generally recognized, but nothing much was done.

After almost a century of disuse, the old dry dock was fixed from 1836 to 1837 for 176,000 guilders. The traditional lock gate doors were replaced by a caisson door. The lock on the city side of the dry dock (Leeuwensluis) was replaced by a dam and the Leeuwensluis itself widened and joined to the existing dry dock. The dry dock then measured 69 m by 18.7 m. A steam engine was installed to empty it. Because of the enlargement the restored dry dock could welcome almost any Dutch warship. The Adolf van Nassau with a length of 72.86 m p.p., launched in 1861, was probably the first Dutch warship that did not fit in the Vlissingen dry dock.

=== Voorhaven and Buitenhaven ===
The Voorhaven (Harbor in front) was a stretch of water between the sea lock and the sea. It always took a lot of effort to keep this harbor at the required depth for ships to reach the sea lock. Part of it was done by flushing out water from the dock at high speed, so all kinds of sand and sediment was pushed to sea. The Buitenhaven was the harbor outside of the city. The fairway from open sea through the Buitenhaven to the Voorhaven also had to be kept at depth. Ships could anchor safely in the Buitenhaven, but had to move elsewhere in winter.

== The first Admiralty shipyard ==
During the Dutch Republic naval affairs were handled by 5 local admiralties. The Admiralty of Zeeland had multiple shipyards, the most important one was situated in Vlissingen. Before the creation of the current dock the admiralty shipyard was located at the city-end of the first dock. That is about where later the large building slips of the Rijkswerf were made. Like the private shipyards at that location, the admiralty shipyard had to be moved to a new location when the current dock was made.

== The second Admiralty shipyard ==
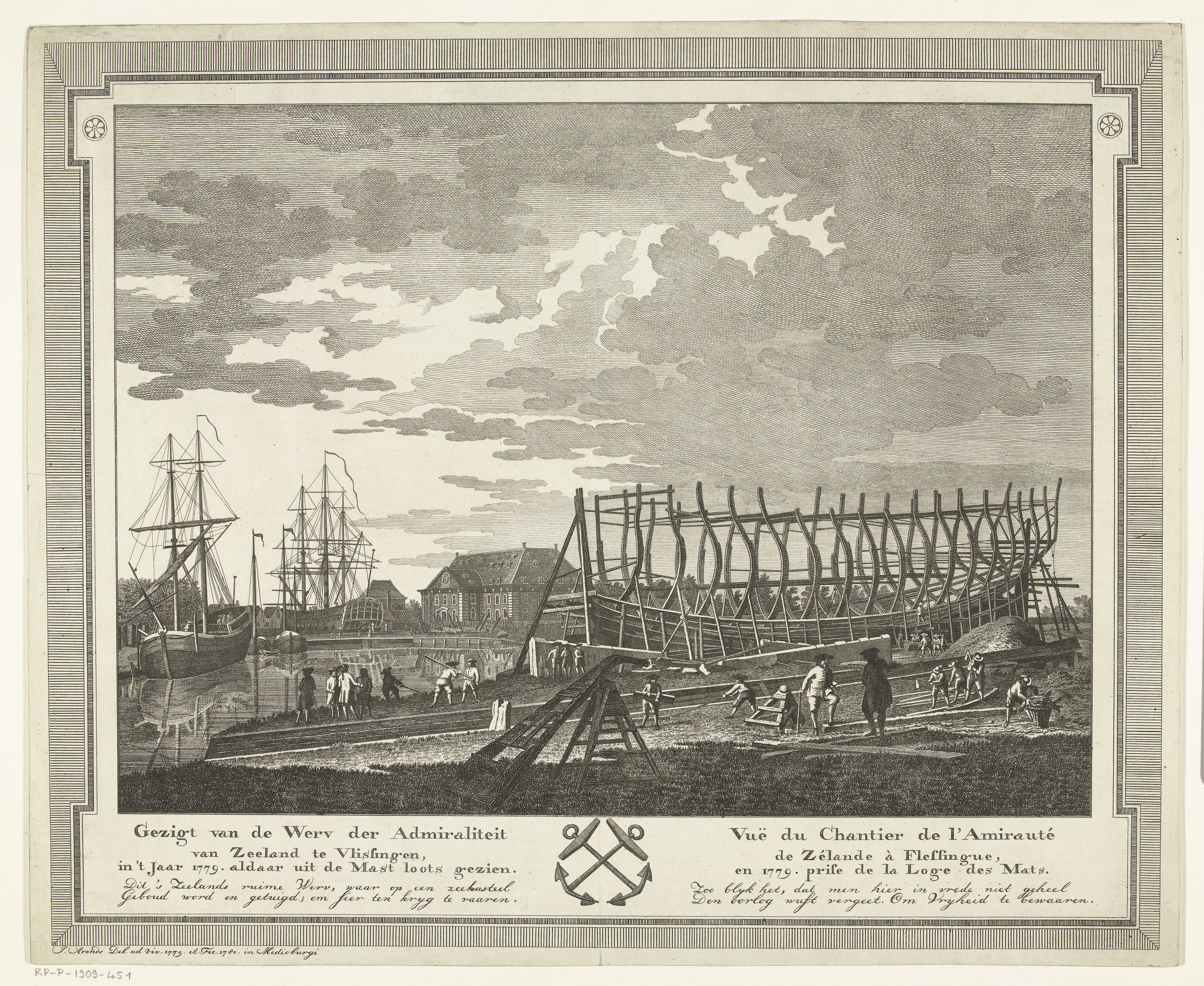
View of the shipyard and arsenal in 1779

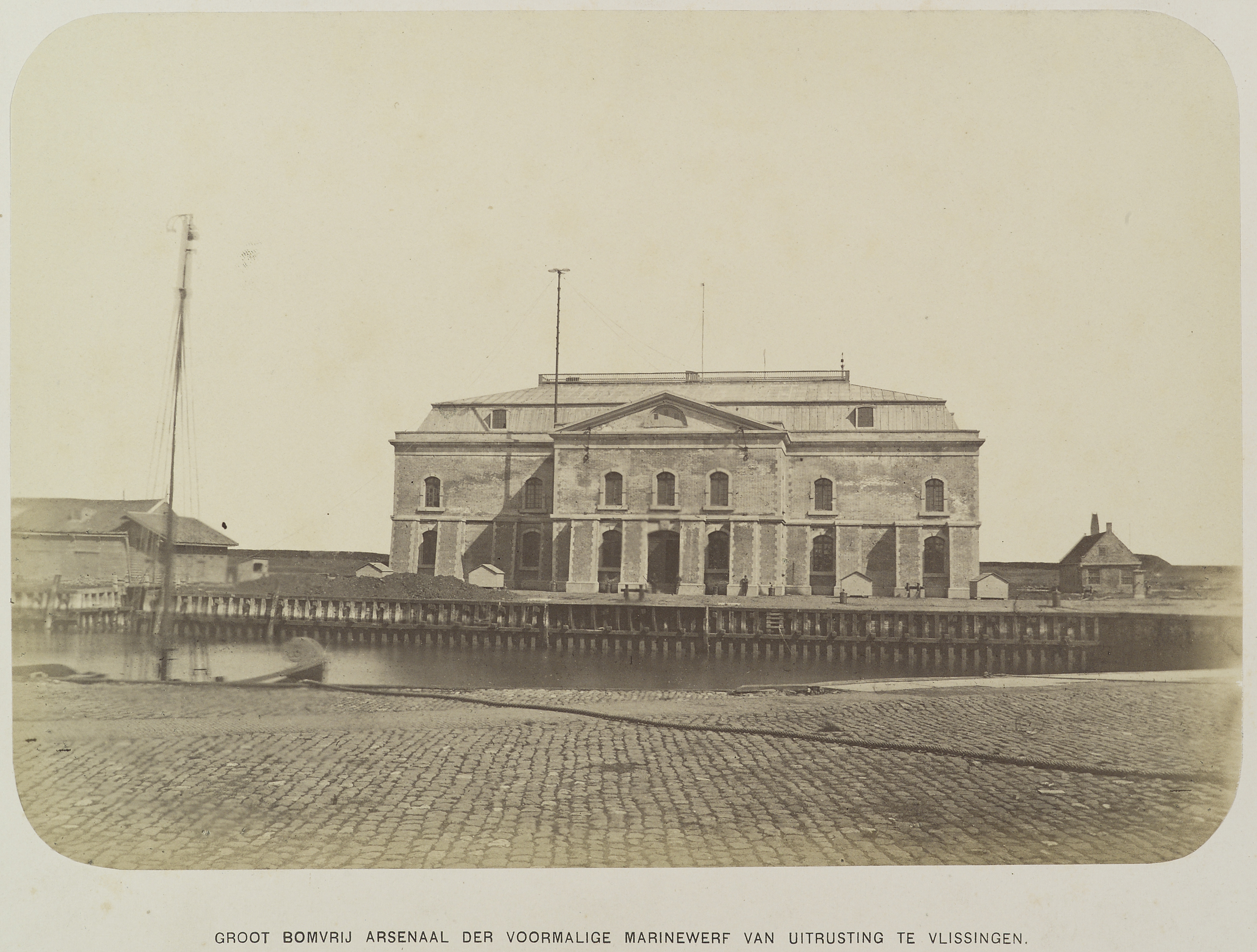
Zeemagazijn (Arsenal) of Vlissingen built late 18th century, photo c. 1868

After the creation of the current dock the admiralty shipyard was moved. The shipyard and its slips were relocated just outside of the new dock on the east side of the Voorhaven. Some private shipyards were located on the other side of the Voorhaven. Apart from the house of the equipagemeester all buildings of the admiralty shipyard were consumed by the fire of 1749.

The admiralty shipyard was rebuilt. A map of the 1798 situation shows what buildings and slips the Admiralty yard had at the time. At that moment it had two big slips, one small slip, and a slipway that could be used to pull ships out of the water. A map from 1807 shows that it still had 4 slipways.

While the admiralty shipyard did not build that many ships, the yard build some relatively big ships. The rationale behind it was that up to a certain size, bigger ships were cheaper than smaller ships. These could easily be built in Vlissingen, because of the location on the deep Schelde. On the contrary Amsterdam had to lift bigger ships on camels in order to get them to sea.

=== Zeemagazijn or Arsenal ===
The most prominent building of the yard was the Zeemagazijn, also called Arsenal (not to be confused with the 'old arsenal' or the present arsenal dating from the French time). After a fire in 1749, the admiralty asked for permission to build a new arsenal in 1767. The first stone was laid on 12 October 1767. It was destroyed by the English in 1809, who left nothing but the bare walls. In 1810 the French started to rebuild as a more massive bomb-free building with big buttresses. The walls were between 1.5 and 1.9 meter thick, and the roof was made of stone. In 1825 the roof was replaced by one made of zinc and having a small gallery at the top. It provided a good view of the harbor. Later a Time ball was attached to the top of the building, enabling sailors to set their Marine chronometers. On the inside a room was made to do meteorologic observations. Inside the building there were three levels with 6 large rooms each and housed everything needed for equipping a ship, including a sail workplace. After the navy left the building was used shipyard De Schelde from 1875. The building was demolished in 1968–1969.

=== The Masthouse ===
In front of the arsenal there was a sheerleg to place masts in ships and to remove masts from ships. The masts where stored in the masthouse (mastloods). For ships that were put in reserve in the dock, it made sense to dismount the upper parts of the masts before entering the dock, and to store these in a building there, instead of moving them overland. This made even more sense because these parts were interchangeable between ships. Therefore, we know what the 1779 picture of the admiralty yard depicts: It is a view from the top of the masthouse towards the great arsenal, and depicts the slips, and a ship in the dock behind the sea lock. The mastloods was destroyed in 1809.

=== The French time ===
During the French time the old shipyard continued in operation. Before 1803 the French government had bought the Admiraalshuis, situated on the north side of the dock. It housed the French naval commissionary for the base. In 1803 this was François Lazare Guys, whose son Constantin Guys was born here on 3 December 1802. The Dutch government would later continue the Admiraalshuis as housing for the commander of the base. In 1809 an English expeditionary force captured two ships under construction, and destroyed two others. It also destroyed almost all naval facilities in Vlissingen. The French did have an interest in a naval base in Vlissingen, and therefore they started to reconstruct the naval base in 1810. For constructing warships they had far better facilities in Antwerp.

== Rijkswerf Vlissingen ==
=== The Rijkswerf: two shipyards ===
After the regained independence the Dutch state again wanted to have a shipyard in Vlissingen. This would become the Rijkswerf Vlissingen. In mid July 1814 Rear Admiral Otto Wilem Gobius (1758-1848) was appointed as 'directeur' of the Maritime etablissement Vlissingen and 'commander' of the Ships and Vessels of War in the Zeeland waters. The wording of the appointment reflected his dual responsibility. He was 'directeur' of the shipyard, and 'commander' of the area. The Rijkswerf would also be split in two. The equipment yard (Werf van Uitrusting) was situated close to the sea, and included the terrain of the old shipyard. A new construction yard would be built from 1817 on the far end of the dock.

=== The equipment shipyard ===
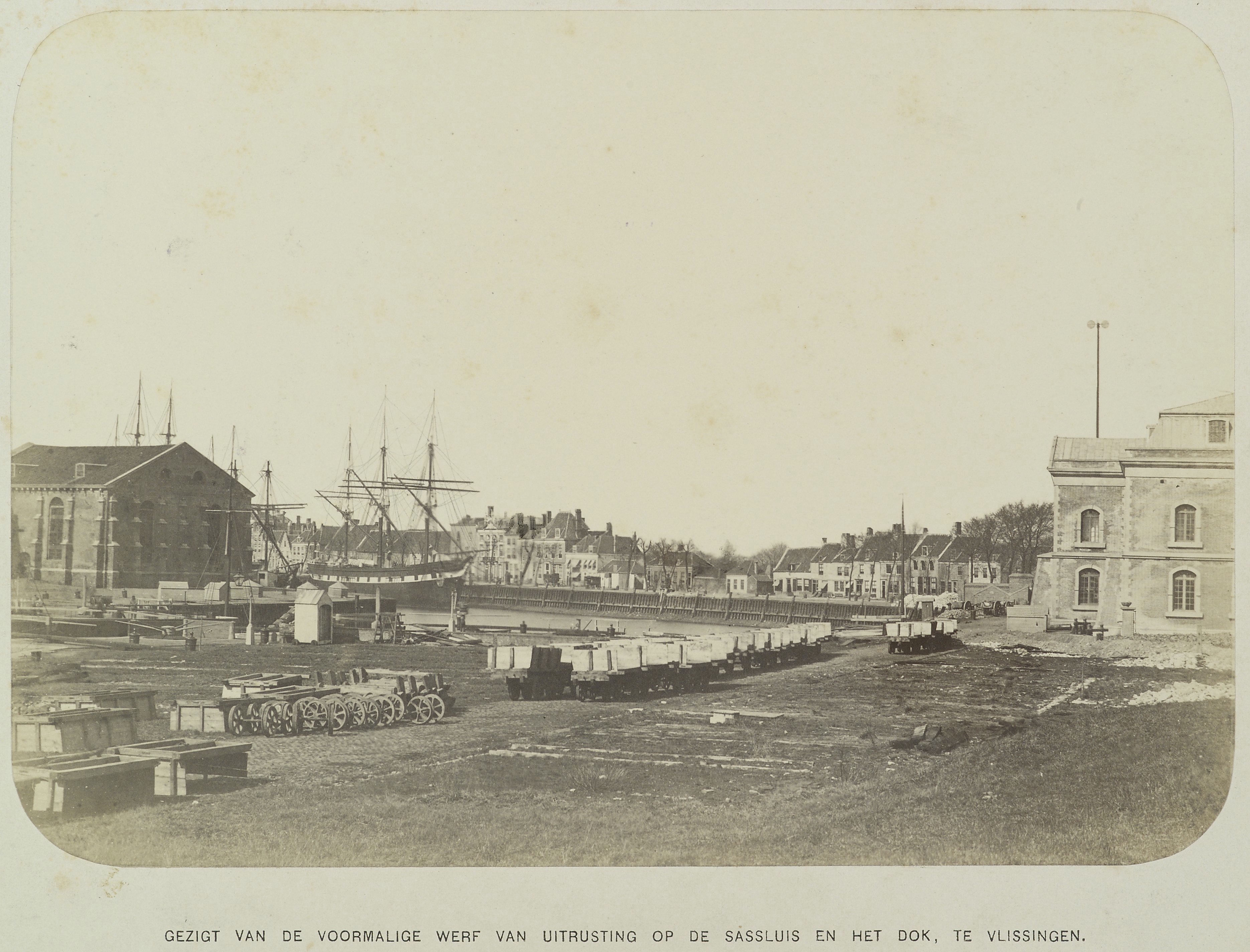
Zeemagazijn on the right, on the left the Storehouse that used to be the Oostkerk, also a glimp of the lock, photo c. 1868

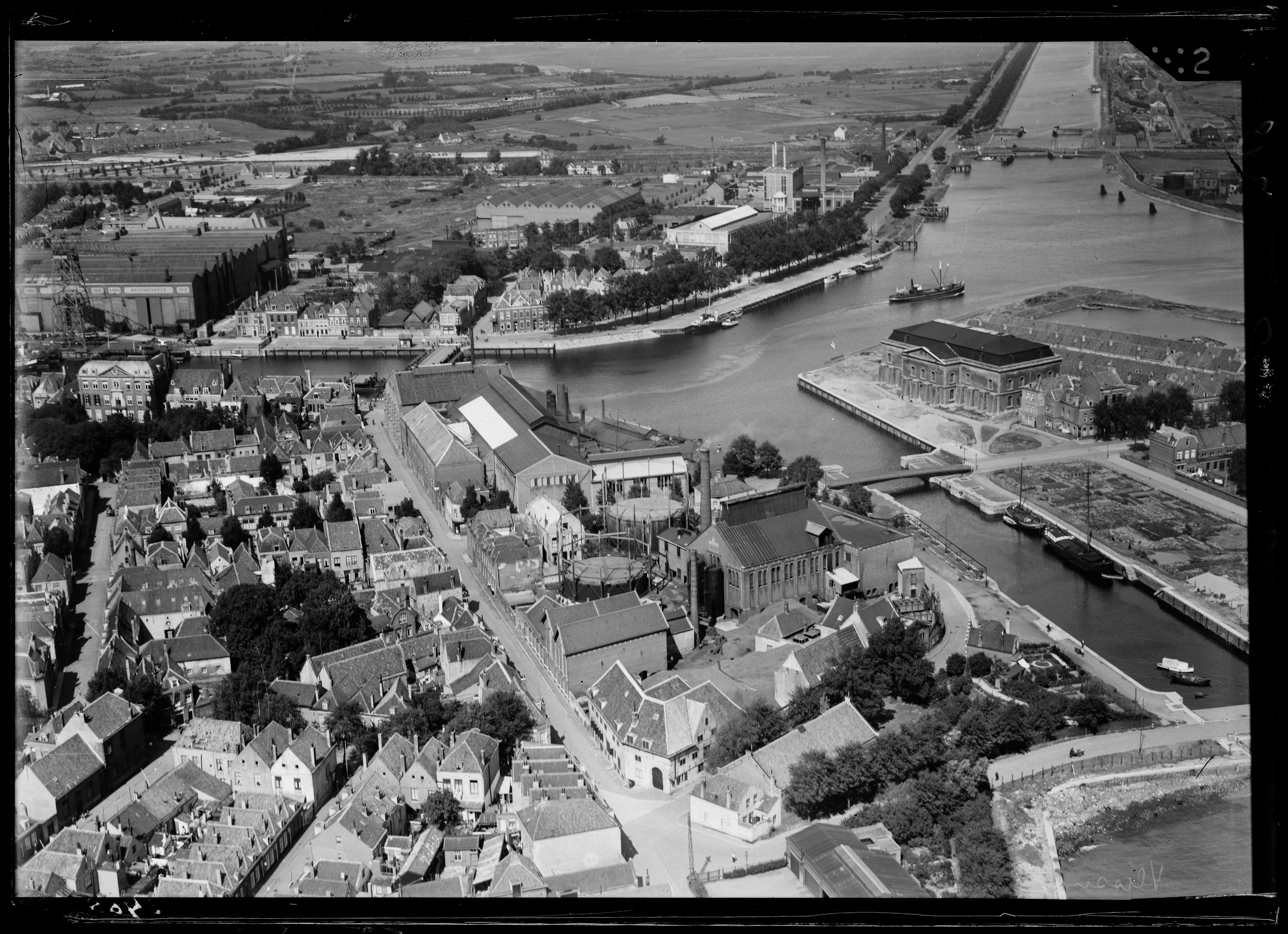
Zeemagazijn and sea lock on the right, Dock and Dishoeck house on the left photo 1920-1940

At first the Rijkswerf was a simple successor to the old French naval base. It was a naval base and a ship yard meant to equip ships that were new, pulled from reserve, or returned from sea. In this respect it was more than a simple base. Ships could unload their guns, masts and rigging for storage, and then be laid up or get careened. After that they could be re-armed etc. An early 19th century map shows that most of the terrain of the previous yard remained rather empty.

==== Warehouse Nr 1 (Old Arsenal) ====
The equipment yard did use the Zeemagazijn or arsenal described above. In 1814 it was called 'Magazijn Generaal der levensmiddelen van oorlog', indicating that in 1814 it was used as a general warehouse for foodstuff. Later the also was named Magazijn (warehouse) number 1.

==== Warehouse Nr 2 (Oostkerk) ====
On the west side of the water, north of the sea lock, there was a big storehouse with buttresses. It was called Magazijn (warehouse) number 2. It used to be the Oostkerk that was built from 1650 to 1654. The church had a small tower on top of the roof and was burned during the fire of 1749. A piece of burning sailcloth was blown from the burning admiralty warehouse on the Pottekaai and clung to the small tower, burning the church down in moments. From 1752 it was restored. In 1808 the church was commandeered by the French as a storehouse. In 1809 it was burned down by the British bombardment, leaving nothing but the walls. In 1812 the building was rebuilt as warehouse, and so it became part of the Rijkswerf Vlissingen. As such it was used from 1815. Its four levels stored anchors, cables, rigging and chains. A small section of buttressed wall remains in the Onderstraat, and may be the only building that's left of the Rijkswerf.

==== Takelmagazijn ====
South of the Warehouse Nr 2 the new kingdom disowned some buildings, and built a new rectangular building with a nice Facade and frontispiece facing the shipyard. In the takelmagazijn the shrouds and other parts of the rigging were made and stored. In September 1817 a tender was announced for paving the terrain in front of the recently built takelmagazijn. The takelmagazijn would stand long enough for it to be on aerial photographs. It was later demolished.

==== Other Buildings ====
New buildings on the east side of the water were a building for making barrels, one for storing barrels, a rifle workshop, and a workshop for making blocks. On the west side of the dock was an office, and a beer-storehouse, probably both existing buildings.

=== The construction shipyard ===
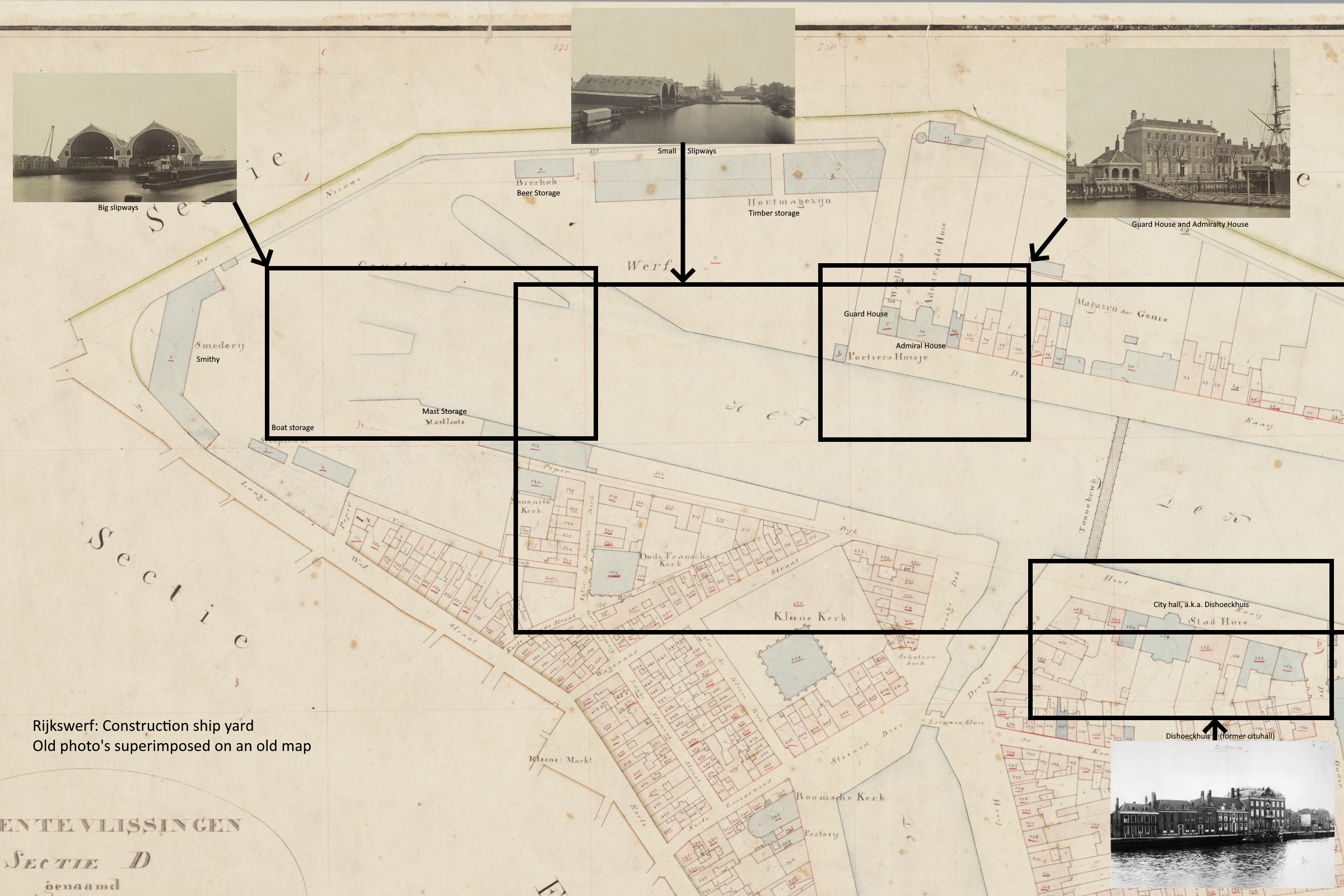
Overview of the Rijkswerf Vlissingen construction yard

==== An enclosed terrain ====
The construction shipyard was founded on an enclosed terrain that measured about half of the surroundings of the dock west of the dry dock. The early days of the construction yard can be followed from the public tenders for all kinds of constructions. In October 1816 a road from the Kolvenierstraat to the Peperstraat was ordered. It made the terrain accessible. In April 1817 there were orders for demolishing several buildings still standing on the terrain; Walling up the facades on the Walstraat of several buildings; building two walls in the Kolvenierstraat; Transforming the building on the corner of the Kolvenierstraat (next to the Admiraalshuis) in a guard house; Building two stretches of wall of about 200 meters, parallel to the city walls. This closed of the northern part of the shipyard from the city. In June a third tender followed: Building a wall of 100 meters; Disassembling in Antwerp and reconstruction in Vlissingen of the big wooden warehouse, the big masthouse, the artillery and boat warehouses. Later on, in June 1818 there would be orders for: a 117-meter stretch of wall along the ditch behind the new shipyard; a 17-meter stretch of wall; Increasing the height of the wall behind some houses in the Wallstraat, and lengthening it by 28 meters.

==== The slips ====
The shipyard had two big slips where ships of the line and frigates could be built. These were made so the ships could be launched in line with the dock. In the correspondence of the shipyard the first mention of the slips is from late November 1817. In 1818 they were getting dug out, while in 1819 there was mention of constructing the first slip and starting the second. In August 1819 the first ship (the Zeeuw) was laid down on the first slip. In October 1820 there were orders to cover the roof over the Zeeuw with Roof shingles. In May 1822 there were orders for the construction of a wooden roof over the ship of the line Neptunus, under construction in Vlissingen. In a sense the two slips that now still exist as remnants on the dock were the successors of these two slips. Close by the big slips, at a small angle to the dock, was a slipway that could be used to pull ships out of the water. This slipway was (later?) equipped with steam power. Two minor slips were made in 1823 on the north side, perpendicular to the dock. These also got roofs.

==== Buildings on the construction yard ====
There were several significant buildings on the construction yard. These can be described going against the clock, from the enclosure of the yard on the north side of the dock. On the north side there was a small house for the doorman on the waterside. After passing through the gate, on the right hand, there was an extensive timber warehouse built of wood on a stone foundation. Next there was a big building with on the lower level offices and a wood storage, and on the upper floor storage for copper- and ironwork, a painting- and timber shop and the room for models and construction drawings. The attic of this building was called mold-attic and used to store the molds for the ships that were built. The next building was a sculptor's workshop and beer storage. At the western extremity of the yard, 'behind' the big slipways stood the smithy. On the south side of the shipyard there was a storage for coal, a boat storage (in Dutch: sloop storage), and on the Peperdijk the Masthouse.

The smithy was a rather massive building. Maps show that it probably was or used parts of an earlier building. It was constructed in 1818 and had 22 fireplaces, most of the tools and equipment came for the smithy in Antwerp that was closed. The smithy would later be expanded. First a copper and plumber's workshop was built adjacent on one side, and on the other side a storage for iron and nails. Later the storage for iron and nails was expanded into a workshop that could process armor plate. It got a steam engine to replace the Bellows, and got steam hammers, steam driven Lathes, planers drills etc.

== Activity of the shipyard ==
=== Recovering a fleet ===
After the allies and the French signed an armistice 23 April 1814, the Dutch took control of Vlissingen on 6 May 1814. At first the re-establishment of the naval base / shipyard seems to have remained a rather theoretical affair. There was neither tooling nor equipment because the warehouses remained under French control till 20 August 1814. There was work to do, because in accordance with the armistice and the Treaty of Paris (1814) the Dutch got: all ships captured before 23 April, including the squadron of Texel; all ships built in Holland; and one third of the ships in Belgium. The Dutch ships regained in Vlissingen were the Ship of the line Chattam (as a storage ship for food) and the Frigates Vriesland, Eurydice and Kenau Hassselaar and 8 gunboats. In Antwerp the Dutch ships of the line Hollandais and Tromp and the frigates Minerva and Van der Werf and a schooner were found. All together the Dutch recovered and gained in the south:

Dutch ships recovered in the south by the treaties of 1814
Ship	previous names	Guns	Type	Launched	Enn	Notes
Kenau Hassselaar	Diana	32	Frigate	1805	Sold 1841 Nieuwediep	To sea October 1814
Van der Werf		44	Frigate	1812	1821 to Colonial Navy	To the West Indies Nov. 1815
Eurydice		32	Frigate	1802	BU 1847 Vlissingen	To the West Indies Nov. 1815
Tromp		68	Ship of the line	1808	1820 to Colonial Navy	To the East Indies March 1817
Vriesland	Auroroa	32	Frigate	1803	BU April 1817	
Hollandais	De Ruijter, Piet Hein, Rotterdam, K. Hollander	90	Ship of the line	1806	BU 1819 Vlissingen	
Chattam		90	Ship of the line	1800	BU 1823 Vlissingen	
Minerva		32	Frigate	1805	BU 1835 Vlissingen	

French ships in the south gained by the Dutch by the treaties of 1814
Ship (ex-French)	New name	Guns	Type	Launched	End	Notes
Auguste	Prins van Oranje	80	Ship of the line	1811	Sold 1825	To the West Indies Nov. 1815
Charlemagne	Nassau	74	Ship of the line	1807	1818 to Colonial Navy	To the East Indies March 1816
Cesar	Prins Frederik	74	Ship of the line	1807	Sold 1821 England	To the East Indies 31 Aug 1816
Albanais	Batavier	74	Ship of the line	1808	BU 1817	
Tilsit	Neptunus	80	Ship of the line	1810	BU 1818	
Friedland	Vlaming	80	Ship of the line	1810	BU 1823	
Pultusk	Waterloo	74	Ship of the line	1807		

=== Ships to the Colonies ===
In 1814 The top priority for the Dutch fleet was re-establishing control of those colonies that the United Kingdom returned to the Netherlands. There were hardly any warships in seaworthy condition, and building new ships would take too much time. Therefore, the Vlissingen base and ship yard had to select ships from those that were available and equip these. The intrinsic problem of these ships was that they had been constructed too quickly, out of the wrong wood, and with bad workmanship. Vlissingen had to put them in the best condition that was possible and to equip them. A small success was attained when on 12 October 1814 the frigate Kenau Hasselaar was brought out of the dock. On 14 October she was said to be the first Dutch warship to leave Vlissingen for open sea.

The Dutch and ex-French ships from Antwerp were moved to Vlissingen to get equipped there too. On 13 October 1814 the ex-French ship of the line Caesar of 74 guns arrived from Antwerp, and on the 14th the Charlemagne of 84. Both were brought into the dock. In June 1815 the Tromp and Albanais arrived in Vlissingen from Antwerp, just before the Battle of Waterloo. On 25 August 1815 the Hollander and Friedland anchored before Vlissingen. On the 26th the Friedland, renamed 'Vlaminger', was brought into the 'harbor', and into the dock in 1.5 hours. The ship was noted to have 80 guns and a draught of 21 feet 8 inch On 14 September 1815 the Frigate Minerva under Pietersen arrived from Antwerp.

On 21 November 1815 a squadron under VA van Braam left Vlissingen for the Dutch West Indies. It consisted of the Prins van Oranje (84, ex Auguste), Captain Lewe van Aduard; the frigate van der Werf, Captain Kolf; the frigate Euridice, captain Guineseau, the brig Irene captain-lt Spengler and the Schooner Haay under captain-lt Quariel. On 3 May 1816 the Prins arrived back before Vlissingen. On 16 July 1816 the Prins van Oranje was getting re-equipped for duty, probably after careening. In the evening the main mast and mizzen mast had been set in, when suddenly the sheerleg fell over backwards. It first hit and broke the main mast, next the mizzen mast, and then all hit the Poop deck with a sound of thunder. Only one sailor was killed, seven others wounded. After repairs the Prins van Oranje, destined for the Mediterranean left the dock for the harbor on 24 Augustus.

In 1816 Vlissingen would send two more ex-French ships of the line to the East Indies. In 1817 the Tromp would follow. In the years that followed no more old ships were sent out. Instead they were successively broken up. The disasters that happened with these ships probably had to do with this change of policy. The cost of these disasters, the fact that the colonies had been brought under control, or the availability of better ships might have been other reasons to stop working on the old ships.

=== New ship built on the old shipyard ===
While the yard was busy trying to put old ships to sea, it probably did not have a slip required to build a serious new warship. However, there is reason to suppose that the restored shipyard attempted to do some construction on the old location. On 20 June 1818 the brig Courier was launched in Vlissingen. It was the first ship built in Vlissingen since the independence, and in view of construction times, it's likely that a yard on the old terrain was used instead of a slip on the new construction yard.

=== First ships built on the Construction shipyard ===
An overview of sailing ships launched in the first years of the new kingdom of the Netherlands shows that the biggest ships were indeed launched in Vlissingen. In August 1819 the 'Zeeuw' was laid down on the shipyard. Nevertheless, after the Zeeuw had been launched in 1825, the outer harbor had to be deepened before the navy could start to equip the ship in 1826. Apart from these only light frigates and smaller craft were built in Vlissingen. So there was not much activity in the early years of the Rijkswerf.

=== Screw propulsion (1850-1860) ===
The introduction of screw propulsion started a new growth period for the Rijkswerf. Steam frigates, and even frigates with auxiliary steam power, were so big that they could hardly be built in Amsterdam in the 1850s.

=== Armored ships (1860-1868) ===
When foreign powers started to armor their ships, the Dutch authorities decided to create facilities for armoring in Vlissingen, not in Amsterdam.

== Ships built on the Rijkswerf Vlissingen ==
Ship	Type	Launched	Disp.	Notes
De Ruyter	Frigate	1853		Later converted to casemate ironclad
Prinses Amelia	Corvette with auxiliary power	1855	1,512	
Evertsen	Steam frigate	1857	3,375	First Dutch frigate designed for screw propulsion.
Vesuvius	Sloop with auxiliary power	1858	759	
Zeeland	Steam frigate	1859	3,300	
Adolf van Nassau	Steam frigate	1861	3,750	
Leeuwarden	Steam corvette	1861	2,030	
Curaçao	Steam corvette	1863	2,030	

== The end of the Rijkswerf Vlissingen ==
In 1867 the Dutch government decided to move the armoring facilities to the Rijkswerf Amsterdam. This move spelled the end for the Rijkswerf Vlissingen. The end had been delayed when two steam corvettes of the Groningen class had to be rebuilt unexpectedly. After the last of these, the Citadel van Antwerpen was finished and towed out in August 1868 the evacuation of the shipyard started.

== Koninklijke Maatschappij De Schelde ==
After the Rijkswerf left Vlissingen, the grounds of the construction yard were bought by shipyard De Schelde. The Schelde would soon become Koninklijke Maatschappij De Schelde and built so many ships for the Dutch navy that it became the practical successor of the Rijkswerf Vlissingen. De Schelde exists today as Damen Schelde Naval Shipbuilding, and is the only yard that still builds major warships for the Dutch navy and also for other navies.
