= HNLMS Wassenaar (1856) =

Koninklijke Marine ship

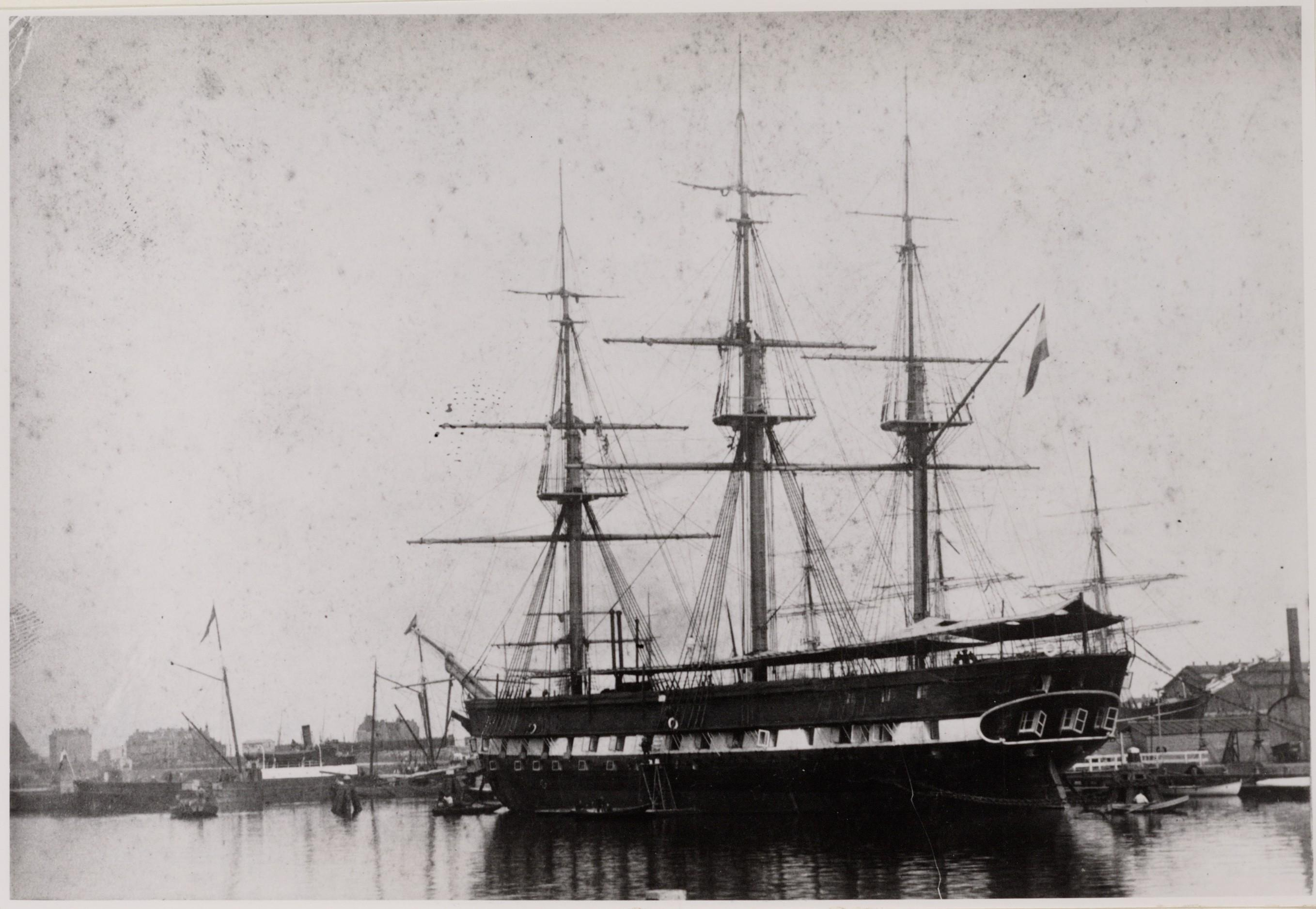
- Admiraal van Wassenaar in the Oosterdok, adjacent to Rijkswerf Amsterdam

History

Netherlands
- Name: Wassenaar
- Namesake: Lt-Admiral van Wassenaar
- Builder: Rijkswerf Amsterdam
- Cost: 910,000 guilders
- Laid down: 12 February 1853
- Launched: 6 September 1856
- Commissioned: 16 July 1857
- Decommissioned: 31 December 1912

General characteristics (as completed)
- Displacement: 2871t
- Length: 62.36 m (204 ft 7 in)(l. water line); 59.26 m (194 ft 5 in)(p.p.)
- Beam: 14.30 m (46 ft 11 in)
- Draft: 6.30 m (20 ft 8 in)
- Installed power: 300 nominal horsepower
- Speed: 6.5 knots (machines only); 11+ kn (machines and sail)
- Complement: 460
- Armour: none

HNLMS Wassenaar, was a unique ship built for the Royal Netherlands Navy.

== Context ==
The Admiraal van Wassenaar was part of the 1852 program which started the introduction of screw propelled warships to the Dutch navy. The first phase of the plan consisted of the Wassenaar, two steam corvettes of the Medusa class, and the steam schooner Montrado. The Wassenaar was laid down in Amsterdam on 12 February 1853. When she was commissioned in July 1857, she was the first steam frigate of the Dutch Navy.

== Characteristics ==
=== Design ===
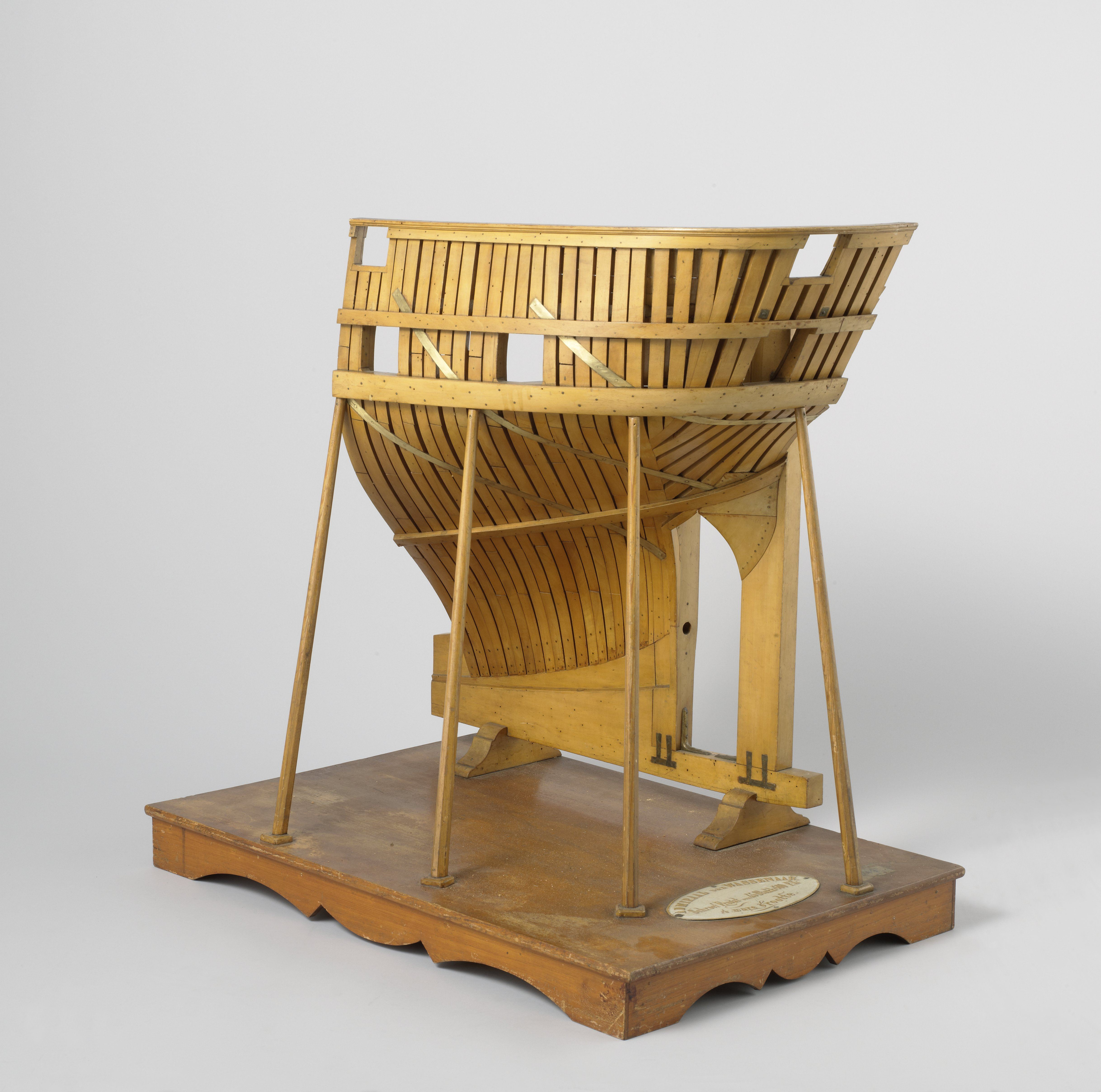
Stern of Wassenaar

The Wassenaar was originally designed and partly built as a sailing frigate. This meant that her dimensions were the same as those of a sailing frigate laid down decades earlier, except that she was about 6.5 m longer. That she was only 6.5 m longer was due to the fact that she was meant to be a frigate with auxiliary power. Therefore, her engine was relatively small, and could be fitted with relatively small adjustments.

The first captain of the Wassenaar would personally arrange his own quarters to include a comfortable sleeping place, a small saloon, and an anteroom or as he called it 'church'. In the anteroom there was place for two quadrilles of eight pairs each. He personally spent a lot of money to lavishly decorate these rooms. He later noted that he did not regret this, as there were often 25-30 ladies in these rooms.

=== Machinery ===
The Wassenaar had machines of 300 nominal horse power made by Fijenoord in Rotterdam. These were to make about 50 turns On the first trial run the Wassenaar attained a speed of over 8 miles. The machinery made 56 turns with a vacuum of 25.5–26 cm, the screw slipping 20%. Of course this trial was not with full load, nor sails, so it was not that precise for the speed she would attain later. On her first trip from Nieuwediep to Plymouth she reached 6.5 knots at full speed, the screw making 52 turns a minute.

=== Sails ===
As a frigate with auxiliary power the Wassenaar was first and foremost a sailing frigate. She had the sail plan of a Full-rigged ship, allowing her to make over 10 knots under advantageous conditions. Of her first 13 month trip to the Mediterranean (cf below) the mode of travel per day is known. She used sails only on 95 days, steam and sails on 21 days, and steam only on 2 days. In this respect the cost of coal was significant. Her first captain would later note that the Wassenaar could easily consume 1000 guilders a day in coal.

=== Armament ===
Deck	Gun type	Original armament	Later	As training ship
At the Bow	SBML	1 long 60-pdr on pivot and sled	1 long 60-pdr on pivot and sled	
Upper deck	SBML	12 long 30-pdr No 3	2 16 cm RML	
	Shell guns	2 Shell gun 20 cm No3	12 Shell gun 20 cm No3	
Main gun deck	SBML	22 long 30-pdr No 4	24 long 30-pdr No 4	4 long 30-pdr No 4
	Shell Guns	8 Shell gun 20 cm No 2	6 16 cm RML	4 12 cm breach loader

The Dutch navy used smooth bore muzzle loading (SBML) of a uniform caliber of 30 pounds, just like the French and English (32 pound) navies did. The basic policy of these navies was that 1st class frigates mounted heavy 30-pounders on their lower deck, and shorter versions on the upper deck. For the Wassenaar this meant 22 long 30-pdr No 4 on the main gun deck and 12 long 30-pdr No 3 on the upper deck. As shell guns were also required, 8 shell guns 20 cm No 2 were added on the main deck, and 2 shell guns 20 cm No 3 were added on the upper deck. To fight faster steamers a Long 60-pounder guns on pivot and sled was placed on the bow.

This resulted in an armament comparable to foreign steam frigates, e.g. the English frigate HMS Arrogant (1848). The Arrogant had a 32-pounder 56 cwt gun comparable to the Dutch long 30-pounder No 4 and the French long 30-pounder. The same can be said of Arrogant's 32-pounder (42cwt), the Dutch long 30-pounder No 3 and the French 30-pounder short gun The Dutch shell gun 20 cm No 2 weighed 3,100 kg and was comparable to the English ML 8-inch shell gun of 3,300 kg.

A comparison with other ships in the Dutch navy shows that the Wassenaar really did add significant power to the Dutch navy. The previous sailing frigates 1st class had 30 long 30 pounders No 1,2 or 3 (of 2,500 kg) and 22 medium 30 pounders (of 1650 kg). They did not mount a gun comparable to the heaviest foreign 30-pounders and had a weak battery on the upper deck. The Medusa-class, built simultaneously with the Wassenaar, mounted 12-15 long 30-pounder No 3, resulting in a total weight of artillery that was only about one-third of that of the Wassenaar. In summary: the Wassenaar introduced a 30-pounder comparable to the heaviest foreign 30-pounders as main armament on Dutch frigates, and provided the main fire power of the Dutch steam fleet.

By 1869 the Wassenaar had been re-armed. It retained the 60-pounder and had 24 Long 30-pounders No 4, 8 16 cm RML, 12 light grenade guns of 20 cm (probably no3). The exact distribution over the decks was not indicated. When the Wassenaar became a training ship a limited number of guns was retained for the students to practice with.

=== Criticism ===
Her first captain was very enthusiastic about the Wassenaar. His only doubt was the amount of ballast on board. He noted that in rough weather the ship was damaged because it had 80 tons too much ballast. Later he noted that in a storm the ballast had caused so many shocks that amongst other damage the main yard fell down. In January 1858 the Wassenaar was allowed to dump 40 tons of Ballast near Mahon. After dumping another 40 tons of ballast at Malta, and making an alteration that allowed her to lift the screw out of the water, the captain declared the Wassenaar to have been the best sailer that he had ever set foot on. She made 10-10.5 knots on a close reach course. During the 1862 parliamentary investigation Captain-lt J.A.H. Schreuder would state that the Wassenaar was the best of the 5 steam frigates that the Netherlands had.

In the media there were doubts about the fine lines and size of the Wassenaar. When it was getting coppered for its first trip in Vlissingen, the media wrote that the visually perfect ship would make a good steam frigate according to some, but also raised a lot of mixed feelings with others.

== History of Construction of the Wassenaar ==
=== Laid down as ship of the line Piet Hein / Wassenaar ===
The Wassenaar was built using many parts of the Piet Hein. The Piet Hein had been laid down as a ship of the line of 74 guns. On 1 January 1834 she was under construction in Amsterdam. In 1844 the Piet Hein was mentioned as renamed to Wassenaar. In 1850, the Wassenaar was simply mentioned as a ship of the line of 74 guns under construction in Amsterdam. In January 1850 Vice-Admiral Lucas wrote to the king that not half of the ship had yet been finished. Also that the form of the ship was no longer in accordance with the time. It would be best to take of the upper part, make some changes to the rear, and then to finish it as a frigate first class. That would result in a heavy frigate meeting modern demands. Because the wooden slipway parts under the ship had rotted away after 17 years, the ship would be taken apart and laid down again on the slipway of the Tromp. The foremast, bowsprit and sails of the ship Zeeuw would be used. In 1851 the Admiraal van Wassenaar was mentioned as a Ship of the line of the Second class. It had been laid down in 1833 and was to have 74 guns, and was finished 7/20, but she would be finished as a frigate. In 1852 the Wassenaar was mentioned as a frigate of the first class of 54 guns originally laid down as a ship of the line in Amsterdam in 1833.

=== The Wassenaar becomes a steam frigate ===
There can be little doubt about the date of 12 February 1853 for the Wassenaar being laid down. The ship of the line Tromp was launched on 17 July 1850, because her slipway was also rotten. The presence of the Wassenaar as a ship of the line of 74 under construction in the overview of 1 January 1851 suggests that not much had changed in 1850, but the process to take the Wassenaar apart might have started already in 1850. It had been finished at the latest by August 1851. Meanwhile, the big slipway of the Tromp, where she would be laid down again, would be renovated, a process that had not finished by 3 November 1851. Indeed, the overview of ships on the slipways of the Rijkswerf Amsterdam in late 1851 shows the Wassenaar not present on any of these.

Therefore, from August 1851 till 12 February 1853 the Wassenaar was merely a set of part laying around somewhere on the Rijkswerf Amsterdam. This made her very suitable for conversion to a frigate with auxiliary power. In foreign countries this had sometimes been done by jumboisation, i.e. cutting a ship in two and lengthening her to make place for the steam engine. A simple comparison of the size of some sailing frigates and the Wassenaar suggests such an operation, but in fact the above shows that she was rebuilt. This seems to have been done by adding an extra scantling between the main mast and the mizzen mast, and by adding some length in the front.

Name	Laid down	Length	beam	draught
De Rijn (54)	1813-1816	53.25 m	12.30 m	5.75 m
Waal / Prins van Oranje (52-60)	1828-1840	54.00 m	14.24 m	6.30 m
Doggersbank (52)	1831-1841	54.00 m	14.30 m	6.30 m
Ruyter (45) as steam battery	1831-1853	64.52 m	14.46 m	6.80 m
Wassenaar (45)	1833-1853	62.36 m	14.30 m	6.30 m

=== Construction of the Wassenaar ===
In 1853 the Wassenaar was mentioned as a frigate with auxiliary power laid down in Amsterdam in 1853, the number of guns to be mounted not yet known. On 1 January 1854 the number of guns was mentioned as 51. On 1 January 1855 the number of guns was mentioned as 45. On 1 January 1856 this was still the case. On 1 January 1858 the Wassenaar was mentioned as having been launched in 1856. The Wassenaar was indeed launched on 6 September 1856. That not all went well during construction can be deduced by that the Wassenaar had been expected for fitting in Vlissingen in the spring of 1856.

=== Fitting out ===
On 2 May 1857 the Wassenaar passed Willem I Lock on the IJ, the entrance to the Noordhollandsch Kanaal. This was done by letting the Wassenaar wait for some days while the authorities blocked the water in the canal at Buiksloot and let water through the sluice, making that stretch of the canal level with the IJ. This way the Wassenaar was able to pass the sluice that was too short. The cost was a lot sea water damaging the land. On 3 May the Wassenaar passed the sluice in Purmerend without any problem. On 6 May the Wassenaar arrived in Nieuwediep to receive her rigging there. On 22 May the engines of the Wassenaar were tested. On 23 May the Warship Cycloop arrived from Hellevoetsluis. The Cycloop left for Vlissingen that same day with the Wassenaar in tow. On 24 May both arrived in Vlissingen, where the Wassenaar would be coppered. Part of the coppering took place in one of the city's canals, and the last pieces were fit in Vlissingen Navy Drydock. After coppering had been done, some changes had to be made in the lodgings, leading to another delay.

On 6 June the Cycloop arrived in Nieuwediep with the Wassenaar in tow. In Nieuwediep the sailing equipment would be completed. On 15 July the frigate Doggersbank was decommissioned, the crew transferring to the Wassenaar. On 16 July the Wassenaar was commissioned. This might have been a mere administrative affair, because on 24 July there was a message that one had to live on the Doggersbank because the Wassenaar was not yet habitable. On the 25th authorities concluded that her first trip had to be delayed, because there was much trouble with the ironwork. About three weeks after her official commissioning the Wassenaar would indeed be ready to sail.

== Service of the Wassenaar ==
=== First trip to the Mediterranean ===
The trip that the Wassenaar made to the Mediterranean is interesting because one of the officers on board sent letters about it to the press. This might have been Captain de Vaynes van Brakell himself, who would later describe this voyage in his book Zestien zeereizen: herinneringen uit een veertigjarige loopbaan bij de Nederlandsche Marine.

On 4 August at 6 in the morning the Admiraal van Wassenaar steamed out of Nieuwediep. She was destined to Lissabon, where she would meet the sailing frigate De Ruyter and the steam corvette Groningen for a cruise in the Mediterranean. Her first commander was Captain Jhr. H.J.L.T. de Vaynes van Brakell. On the 7th she reached Plymouth to bunker, continuing from there on the 10th. She had a disturbance in the machinery that kept her from using it, but she nevertheless arrived in Lisbon in the evening of the 15th. With machines working and sailing with advantageous wind, she had attained a speed of over 11 knots. In Lisbon she indeed met the De Ruyter and the Groningen, which had the Prince of Orange on board. On 19, 20, 21 and 22 August the prince entertained the Duke of Oporto, older brother of the king, but most of this happened on board the Groningen. The De Ruyter and Wassenaar were visited on the 21st. After the prince left with the Groningen, the Wassenaar and De Ruyter stayed in Lisbon to wait for the brig Zeehond, which carried 12 cadets for them. On 30 August the Zeehond reached Lisbon, and after receiving the cadets, the Wassenaar left for the Mediterranean on 1 September. On 9 September the Wassenaar anchored before Barcelona, and because she was mistaken for the Groningen, she was met with a royal salute. On 20 September a letter from the Wassenaar indicated that she would leave for Valencia the next day, and then sail to Malta, Port Mahon, Palma and Naples, planning to arriving back in the Netherlands in mid November.

The Wassenaar indeed left Barcelona for Valencia on the 20th. She left together with a French squadron of 7 ships of the line, and one frigate all with steam power, under Vice-Admiral Tréhouard. Because the captain of the Wassenaar had bragged about how good his ship sailed, the ships held a little sailing race on a course to Toulon. The Wassenaar managed to keep up with the Bretagne and outsailed the frigate, the Austerlitz and 4 other ships of the line, she could not keep up with the ship of the line Arcole. After changing course to Valenica, with little wind, the Wassenaar arrived in Valencia only on the 24th. Missing the Groningen there, she immediately continued to Palma. Still missing the Groningen she continued to Port Mahon, where the Groningen had left the day before. The Wassenaar then left for Naples, arriving there on 3 October, one day before the Groningen. She left Naples for Messina on 13 October, and arrived there on the 16th. On the 18th she received a telegram from Naples, and steamed out of the harbor only two hours later, setting course for Cadiz. On 28 October the Wassenaar arrived in Cadiz, where she found the Groningen.

The Wassenaar had to wait for the Raphael, a ship with provisions that arrived on 17 November. While waiting the Wassenaar and Ruyter anchored near Fernando and Porto Real. The Wassenaar then sailed from Cadiz on 12 December 1857 and reached Algeciras in one day. While anchored there, a rowboat with some officers left the ship to visit Gibraltar, arriving there in two hours. After arriving back on the ship, the Wassenaar set sail again in the evening. A storm then pushed her back to Gibraltar, where she anchored three days to ride out the storm. While in Gibraltar the Wassenaar met the Prussian frigate Thetis again whose captain had become friends with the captain of the Wassenaar, and so both sailed for Toulon together.

On 3 January 1858 the Wassenaar anchored before Toulon. On 8 January she was in the bay. She observed the three-decker Bretagne, four two-deck ships of the line, 4 frigates with steam power, and the Thetis. The French vice-admiral and many officers visited the Wassenaar, and the officers made many visits to Toulon. In Toulon captain de Vaynes van Brakell met Edmond Jurien de La Gravière. On 15 January the Wassenaar left Toulon, and on 16 January 1858 she arrived in Mahon, hoping to find the De Ruyter there. On the 20th she continued to Malta, arriving there on 23 January. During a storm she entered the harbor at full speed with sail only. In port she met the squadron of Lord Lyons: the three-decker Royal Albert, ships of the line Conqueror, Centurion, Princess Royal, and 9 small steamers. On 26 January the Wassenaar continued to Athens for King Otto's 25 year jubilee. On 2 February she anchored in Piraeus. On 5 February the officers were introduced to the king and queen. They were also present at the festivities. Later the captain accompanied the Dutch ambassador to a diner with the king. The Greek secretaries for war and navy visited the Wassenaar. The next day the Ambassador and the Prince of Würtemberg visited the Wassenaar for a lunch. For the occasion the captain had the Silver Table piece commemorating the admirals of the Wassenaar family on display. (Now in the Maritime Museum Den Helder) The Wassenaar left Piraeus the day after, and after some shooting exercises near Milo, she arrived in Malta on 3 March, where she spent 2.5 months. It was 24 May before the Wassenaar arrived back in Port Mahon. She continued on her cruise in the Mediterranean, because on 10 July she left La Spezia for home, arriving in Gibraltar on 1 August. On the 3rd she left Gibraltar and on the 5th she arrived in Plymouth. She continued to Nieuwediep, but after arriving there on the 25th, she had to turn back to Plymouth in order to use the dry dock there. She left there on 3 September, and arrived in Texel on the 6th.

=== Second trip on the Atlantic Ocean ===
In late 1858 the Dutch government planned for a new 'show of force' in 1859. Therefore, a squadron was formed that consisted of the new (and bigger) steam frigate Evertsen with Rear-Admiral F.X.R. 't Hooft and captain J. May, the Wassenaer under De Vaynes, the steam corvettes Vice-Admiraal Koopman under Captain-lt J.J. van der Moore and Citadel van Antwerpen under Captain-lt W.A. de Gelder, and the screw steamvessel Vesuvius Lieutenant 1st class F. de Casembroot. On 18 October the Secretary for the Navy and Rear Admirals Bijl de Vroe and 't Hooft visited the Wassenaar and the Vesuvius. The Wassenaar then left for the Texel roadstead, from whence the squadron left on the 25th. The squadron sailed to Portsmouth, but the Citadel and Vesuvius had trouble keeping up even when they started to use their engines. In the end the fast sailers had to take in some of their sails. This delay forced the squadron to anchor in St. Helens in the evening of the 26th. On the 27th the squadron reached Spithead. Prince Albert was just escorting his second son Prince Alfred to the steam frigate Euryalus, where he would start his service in the Royal Navy. On 9 November the Wassenaar left for Porto Santo on Madeira, where the squadron would reassemble. The weather was rough during the whole trip, including three storms. A small sailing competition between the Wassenaar and the Evertsen did not show a winner. On 2 December Porto Santo came into view. The Wassenaar then continued to take in water at Madeira. On 17 November the squadron anchored before Cadiz. On the 18th it continued to the yards of Carraca to restore all kinds of damage from the storms. On 9 February 1859 the squadron set out for Lisbon. Here some officers were received by the king (previously Duke of Oporto) and queen. The squadron then visited Plymouth and arrived in the Texel roadstead.

On 1 July 1859 the squadron left Texel again and sailed to Edinburgh. Some officers, including De Vaynes made a tourist trip to the Highlands. Afterwards the squadron sailed back to Texel, arriving there on 4 August, and getting disbanded on the 15th.

=== Trip to the Lisbon ===
Almost immediately after arriving in Texel the Wassenaar had to return south. She had to transport 125 soldiers for Java under Lieutenant 2nd class J.M. Courtois. These would board on the 14th. They were to be transferred to the merchant ship Alcor commander T.J. van Oppen on which a previous group of soldiers had mutinied. The Wassenaar set sail again from Texel on 17 August 1859. On 20 August she was in Plymouth to bunker. The Wassenaar met continued headwinds and therefore had to steam for 10 days, though in order to save cost, this was not done at full power. De Vaynes noted that he would have to account for the cost, but reasoned that a longer trip would cost even more money in food and sold for the 150 men, while the waiting merchant ship would also incur cost while waiting. On the 11th day (28 August) the Wassenaar arrived in Lisbon. The government later approved the decision to steam to Lisbon. The soldiers were transferred to the command of Captain J.G. van Harrevelt, and immediately the Wassenaar started its voyage home.

There was no hurry on the homeward voyage, and so most of the trip was made under sail. Only the stretch from Dungeness (which she passed on 15 September) to north of the Galloper was traversed under steam because of headwinds. These headwinds continued to block the way to Texel. Therefore, the Wassenaar continued to cruise north of the Galloper and the recently installed light ship on the Hinder bank (at the latitude of Vlissingen). In the second night the available depth of water was constantly determined, and reported every half hour. In the morning the weather grew worse, and there was no land or fire ship in sight. First officer Captain-Lt H. Kemper then proposed to fire up the engines, which De Vaynes declined. Kemper then kind of insisted and explained that he was not exactly sure where they were, and that the Wassenaar had a draft of 23 feet, and would be in great danger if she hit the banks of 18 feet depth. The captain then agreed, and because the chief engineer Flaes had been forewarned the Wassenaar quickly made steam. Only fifteen minutes later the captain saw that the water got a milky color, and gave orders to change direction immediately. At that moment the Lighthouse of Goedereede was revealed. The Wassenaar faced a hard struggle to get free of the coast. The bowsprit burst and had to be secured. She then continued to Texel under stream, arriving there on 23 September 1859. It was the last trip of the Wassenaar under Captain de Vaynes, who asked and got replaced on 16 October. Before that the officers of the Wassenaar gave a last ball for all officers and civil authorities on 28 September.

=== With a squadron to the Mediterranean ===
The Wassenaar was planned to sail for Lisbon under her new commander captain R. van Voss in November 1859. She would sail via Cherbourg and Plymouth. In a fierce storm that hit Nieuwediep on 1 November the Wassenaar got loose of its anchor chain, and collided with the sail corvette Juno, both ships getting damaged. After this delay the Wassenaar left for Cherbourg to dock there, but arrived back in Nieuwediep on 21 November due to a problem with the engines. This was fixed by early December. On 9 December the Wassenaar sailed again. She arrived in Cherbourg on 11 December. She indeed went into the dry dock there, and left it on 4 January 1860, but stayed on in Cherbourg for some time. On 17 January the Wassenaar arrived in Plymouth. On 5 February the Wassenaar arrived in Lisbon. She waited for the Zeeland and Evertsen to arrived there, and a squadron was formed under Captain H. Wipff. On 28 June it left Lisbon and on 21 July it arrived in Malta. On 27 July the Wassenaar sailed to Beirut. She arrived there on 5 August. On 16 August the Zeeland joined her, and both saw French steam vessels disembarking troops to support the Turkish authorities. On 18 August the Wassenaar left Beirut for Sidon, arriving there the same day. Ten days later she was back in Beirut. On 20 September she arrived in Alexandria. On 18 October she arrived in Malta. While 50 miles before the Channel, the Wassenaar got in headwinds and made little progress for 9 days. She then hit a bark, probably the 'Queen's Own' in the night of 11–12 November. She was forced to enter Plymouth on 15 November because in the collision she had lost her bowsprit, and especially because of her rudder breaking. She would be fixed in the Devonport yard. On 7 December 1860 the Wassenaar arrived in Vlissingen.

=== In Reserve 1860-1869 ===
There were plans for Wassenaar to be the first ship to use the new Willemsoord Dry Dock II, which was almost completed. These plans failed because of the disaster that happened to this new drydock. On 30 March 1861 Wassenaar arrived in Nieuwediep from Vlissingen. She was planned to be laid up by mid May. On 16 May 1861 she was decommissioned. On 2 June she was reported to be recommissioned quickly after some fixes. The occasion was the American Civil War, which caused the Dutch government to send ship to the West Indies. The reparations to the engines and replacing a deck were postponed.

On 25 October 1861 Wassenaar was the first ship to enter the old graving dock Willemsoord Dry Dock I after it had been rebuilt. The plan was to execute some repairs. However, these repairs would prove far more difficult and extensive than had been planned. The repairs on the machines would be finished only by 18 March 1862. Wassenaar left Dry Dock I only on 5 June 1862, after 7.5 months!

Still another year later, in October 1863, there was news about work on Wassenaar. The events in Japan caused thought about a possible deployment to the East Indies. In June 1863 the steam frigate Zeeland came to Nieuwediep. She would be repaired for deployment to the East Indies, but if the repairs would be too extensive, the Wassenaer would be sent. The Wassenaar was nevertheless kept in working condition; on 20 March 1866 she was brought into Willemsoord Dry Dock I. In February 1867 work was done to enable the Wassenaar to be commissioned on short notice.

=== Voyage to the opening of the Suez Canal ===
On 1 September 1869 the Wassenaar was recommissioned in Nieuwediep. Her commander was Captain F.R. Toewater, first officer Captain-Lt A.N.L. Knoops. She was planned to go to the Mediterranean. On 22 September 1869 Prince Henry of the Netherlands visited the Wassenaar. On 28 September the Wassenaar left the Texel roadstead for the Mediterranean and Egypt. On 1 October she reached Plymouth, and left there on the 4th. On 15 October she arrived in Gibraltar, and left there on the 18th. After running into a small storm on the 22nd, she arrived in Malta on 25 October, and sailed from there on 4 November. On 9 November the Wassenaar arrived in Alexandria. On 16 November she was in Port Said, ready to attend the opening of the Suez Canal that would take place on 17 November. At the time the canal was not deep enough for the Wassenaar, and so another Dutch ship participated in the first voyage through the canal. On 23 November she was back in Alexandria. On 1 December she left from Port Said to sail to La Spezia. En route she was hit by a storm, and therefore she anchored at Malta on 10 December to repair the damage. On 27 December she sailed to La Spezia again. On 1 January 1870 the Wassenaar arrived in La Spezia. On 15 February the Wassenaar left La Spezia for home. On 19 March 1870 she arrived in Texel.

=== Conflict with Venezuela ===
On 1 May Captain F.L. Geerling took command of the Wassenaar. In mid-May 1870 the news was that a projected trip to the Caribbean was cancelled because of the yellow fever in the area. On 15 June 1870 the Wassenaar left Texel for the West Indies. In fact the mission was caused by the Venezuelan government seizing a Dutch ship, and severing ties on 9 May. On 22 July 1870 the Wassenaar arrived in Curaçao. On 27 July the Wassenaar, with the Dutch Chargé d'affairs on board, sailed to La Guaira, the harbor of Caracas. Her appearance before the harbor on 30 July led to the quick release of the Dutch merchant ships Honfleur and Sarah. On 18 October 1870 the Wassenaar arrived back in Texel.

=== Short trip to the Dutch East Indies ===
On 16 January 1871 Captain R.L. de Haes became the new commander of the Wassenaar. On 22 February she left for the East Indies, on the 24th she was near Dover. On 27 March she was sailing the Atlantic just north of the equator. On 15 June the arrived in Batavia. On 31 July she left Batavia for the Netherlands. On 13 September she arrived in Saint Helena. On 3 November she arrived in Falmouth. On 7 November she left Falmouth, and on 9 November she arrived in the Texel roadstead. On 30 November/1 December almost all the officers and crew of the Wassenaar were replaced, but the captain stayed put.

=== Assisting in the handover of Guinea to the English ===
In February 1872 a projected cruise by the Wassenaar to the Mediterranean was cancelled, and instead she was prepared to participate in handing over the Dutch Coast of Guinea to England. She was prepared to leave Nieuwediep on 4 March, but by that time 45 sailors were missing, so the Wassenaar waited two days for the police to put most of them on board 'in irons'. At sea they would receive the usual punishment. The Wassenaar had to go to Guinea to make some show, because only the Screw corvette Citadel van Antwerpen and the Sloop Het Loo were present there. There was a note that it was indeed only show, because the Wassenaar was 'old and broken, declared unfit for the East Indies or the Baltic, but could be used in the Mediterranean. The screw was used up, and could only have been repaired in Feijenoord, but there was no time. It is to be hoped that the ship returns safely, having 6 months of provisions on board.' However, the real reason to send the Wassenaar might have been the number of men that could be landed from board, not the obsolete fighting capabilities of the ship. Anyway, on 6 March the Wassenaar left Nieuwediep. On 29 March the Wassenaar anchored at Cape Verde The handover went much more quickly than anticipated, and took place on 6 April. The Wassenaar arrived in Elmina on 17 April, therefore after the handover. On 10 May she left Elmina to sail home, and arrived in Texel on 24 June.

On 10 August 1872 the Wassenaar left Nieuwediep for a cruise of the North Sea, Scotland and the Shetland Islands. Due to an engine she first anchored in the Mastdiep and then returned to Nieuwediep on the 11th. On the 16th she left Texel. On 6 September the Wassenaar anchored before Leith a harbor near Edinburgh. On 27 September the Wassenaar was back in Texel.

=== Decommissioning ===
On 15 March 1873 the Wassenaar was decommissioned. In a rather alarmist report about the Dutch navy, the Wassenaar did not get a specific negative remark, but was deemed: 'used up by service and through service' (Dutch: versleten in en door de dienst). The other frigates were called: Evertsen bad, patched boilers; Adolf van Nassau very bad; Anna Paulowna not ready, rotten; Zeeland on her way to the East Indies with boilers that were declared unfit three years ago. However, the Wassenaar was declared unfit for sea service.

== Service as a Training ship ==
=== Conversion ===
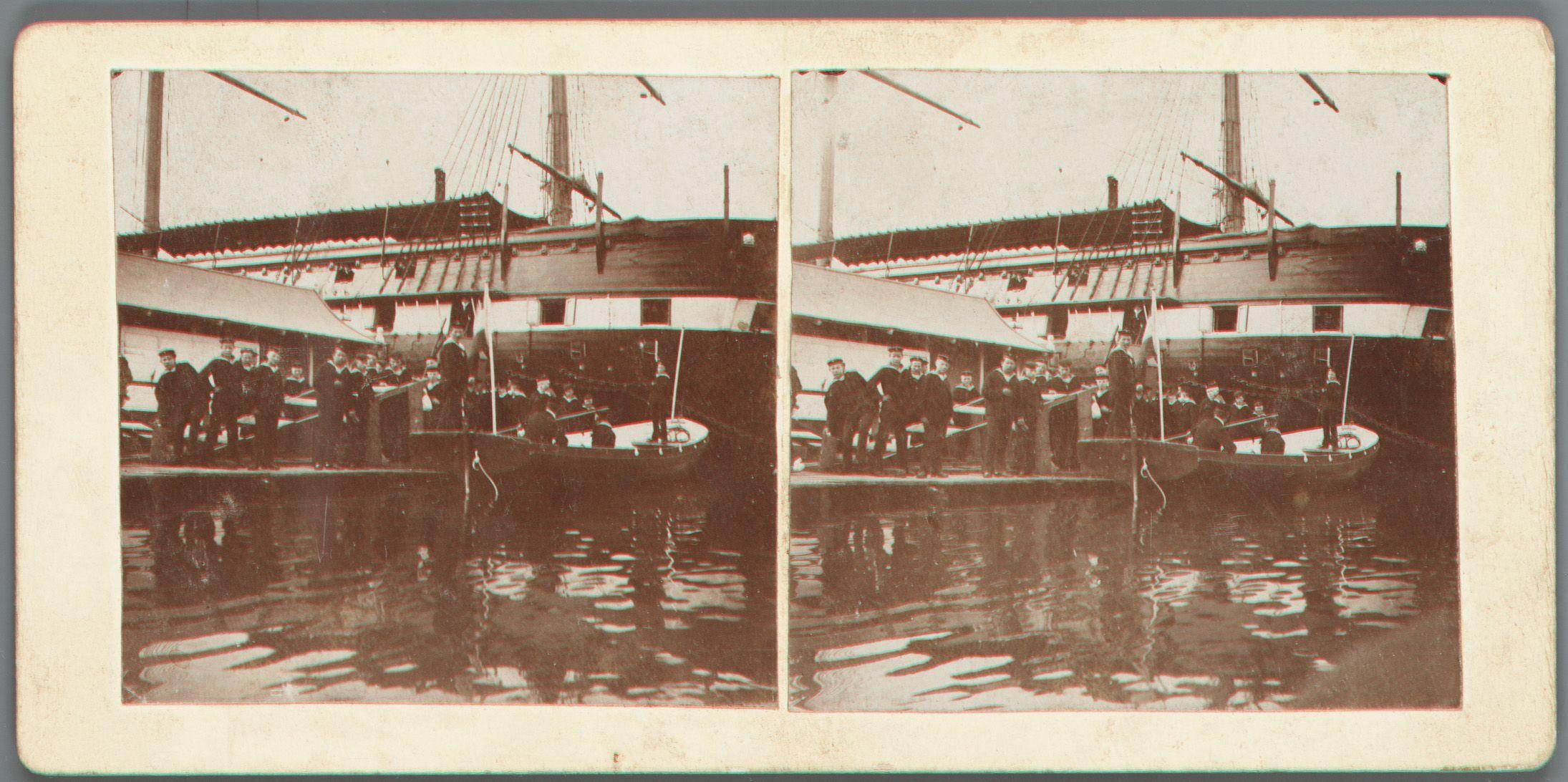
Boys in training on the Wassenaar (c. 1898-1904)

In August 1875 it became known that the Wassenaar would be based in Amsterdam as a training/lodging ship for young sailors. On 4 September 1875 the Wassenaar arrived at the Rijkswerf Amsterdam. In late March 1876 the training ship Wassenaar was described as making a very good impression. The basics had been taken care of: light, fresh air and water. On the upper deck the commander and his wife had sizable lodgings: A well made cabin and saloon, a guest room a bath room and some smaller cabins, very neat but not luxurious. Of course there was a kitchen and room for a maid. The upper deck has ample space for the boys to breathe the fresh air. On the main deck there was a spacious long room and cabins for the officers. Midships there was a space divided into six class rooms, for education and activities that could not be done on deck in bad weather. Further to the front were guns to teach about artillery. At the bow was a bath room and the sick bay with a pharmacy and medical supplies. One deck lower there were similar quarters for the teachers and the non-commissioned officers, who were certainly pleased with their lodgings. The space that had been used to house the steam engine and boilers had been made into a neat gymnasium. In front of that was the space were the boys ate and slept in their hammocks. There was a jail on board, but only four military police on a capacity of 500 boys. The brig Ternate would be added to the Wassenaar for actual sailing practice on the Zuiderzee.

=== Significance ===
Before commissioning the Wassenaar as a training ship the Dutch had commissioned a gun boat as training ship in Leiden in 1856. That the Wassenaar became a training ship was far more significant because of scale of the training. The idea of having a separate training ship was based on the English 'training ships' that tried to train young sailors in the basics of their trade, and to build their character before placing them on active ships. A more solid education would serve multiple goals. It would furnish the navy with sailors that had the education to handle modern arms and machinery, and it would convince that their young sons were in good hands in the navy. This was stressed by the widely proclaimed article 17 of the institute's charter that forbade corporal punishment for boys enlisted on the Wassenaar.

=== Service ===
The training ship Wassenaar was commissioned on 11 April 1876 under command of Captain-Lt de Josselin de Jong. Captain-Lt J.B.A. de Josselin de Jong had been commander of the screw steam sloop Cornelis Dirks. In September 1875 he arrived back in Texel and left the command of the Cornelis Dirks. In October 1875 it became known that he had been sent to England to study the 'training ships' and the education that was given on board these ships. By then he had already been designated as future commander of the training ship Wassenaar. De Josselin de Jong would later become the commander of the Anna Paulowna, when she was commissioned as the second Dutch training ship at Rotterdam.

On 29 April 1876 the king, Prince Henry and Prince Alexander visited the Wassenaar. In late 1876 secretary for the navy Van Erp Taalman Kip was applauded for his policy in the Dutch representative body. More sailors had joined the navy or prolonged their engagement, the Wassenaar had 483 pupils and was doing very well. If things continued this way, the navy would soon have a well educated Dutch crew, and corporal punishment could be abolished. The secretary announced that a second training ship (the Anna Paulowna) would be commissioned in Rotterdam.

The concept of the Wassenaar would become successful. Boys that did have a good Primary education could start in the higher groups and quickly finish the school, or e.g. finish as a Navigator. However, many of the pupils did not have a good primary education, and e.g. could not read or write (properly). The Wassenaar offered them the opportunity to correct this, as well as to learn a trade, and to earn some money. After a few years the education was changed so that boys were first trained at the Kweekschool voor Zeevaart in Leiden, and then sent to either the Wassenaar or the Anna Paulowna. Physical care and education was good, in 1881 a swimming pool was opened on the terrain to ease teaching the boys how to swim. There were also some downsides: there was an iron discipline on board, and a strict hierarchy.

There were plans to decommission the Wassenaar in April 1884, to transfer the education to the Anna Paulowna alone, and to move that ship to Vlissingen. Economy was the prime reason for these ideas, the ships and education costing 350,000 guilders a year. These plans were rejected by the House of Representatives. The Wassenaar did require some repairs to decks, rigging and spars, but did not have to be decommissioned because the boys could temporarily be housed in some of the large buildings on the Rijkswerf. In early October the repairs were finished. In October 1887 there were renewed plans to decommission both training ships and to replace them with one ship in Vlissingen. Part of this plan was executed when in September 1888 the Anna Paulowna arrived in Amsterdam via IJmuiden and was decommissioned there on 1 October. This made the Wassenaar the only training ship for boys, but in mid-August there was an announcement that part of the Anna Paulowna would be used to house boys from the overcrowded Wassenaar. In December 1891 there were 550-720 boys in training on the Wassenaar. In 1892 future queen Wilhelmina visited the Wassenaar and had much fun on the ship.

== Service as a Guard ship ==
=== The education of young sailors is moved ===
In early 1904 the navy planned to move the education of young sailors to Hellevoetsluis. The Wassenaar would then replace the Prince Maurits as Guard ship in Amsterdam. As always there was talk about the temptations of the big city ruining the character of the young sailors. However, the primary reason seems to have been the fear of socialist infiltrators spreading revolutionary ideas among the youngsters.

=== Guard ship in Amsterdam ===
On 1 October 1904 the Prince Maurits was decommissioned to be sold and the Wassenaar became the new guard ship in Amsterdam. Captain J.B. Snethlage would continue as commander. The Dutch navy had the habit of changing the command of a ship almost every year. Officers would therefore regularly be transferred from an active ship to a guard ship (wachtship) the Dutch word for a guard ship. This left some space on board the ship, that was much larger than the Maurits. From 1905 the Wassenaar lodged the two year school for naval administrators.

=== School for wireless telegraphy ===
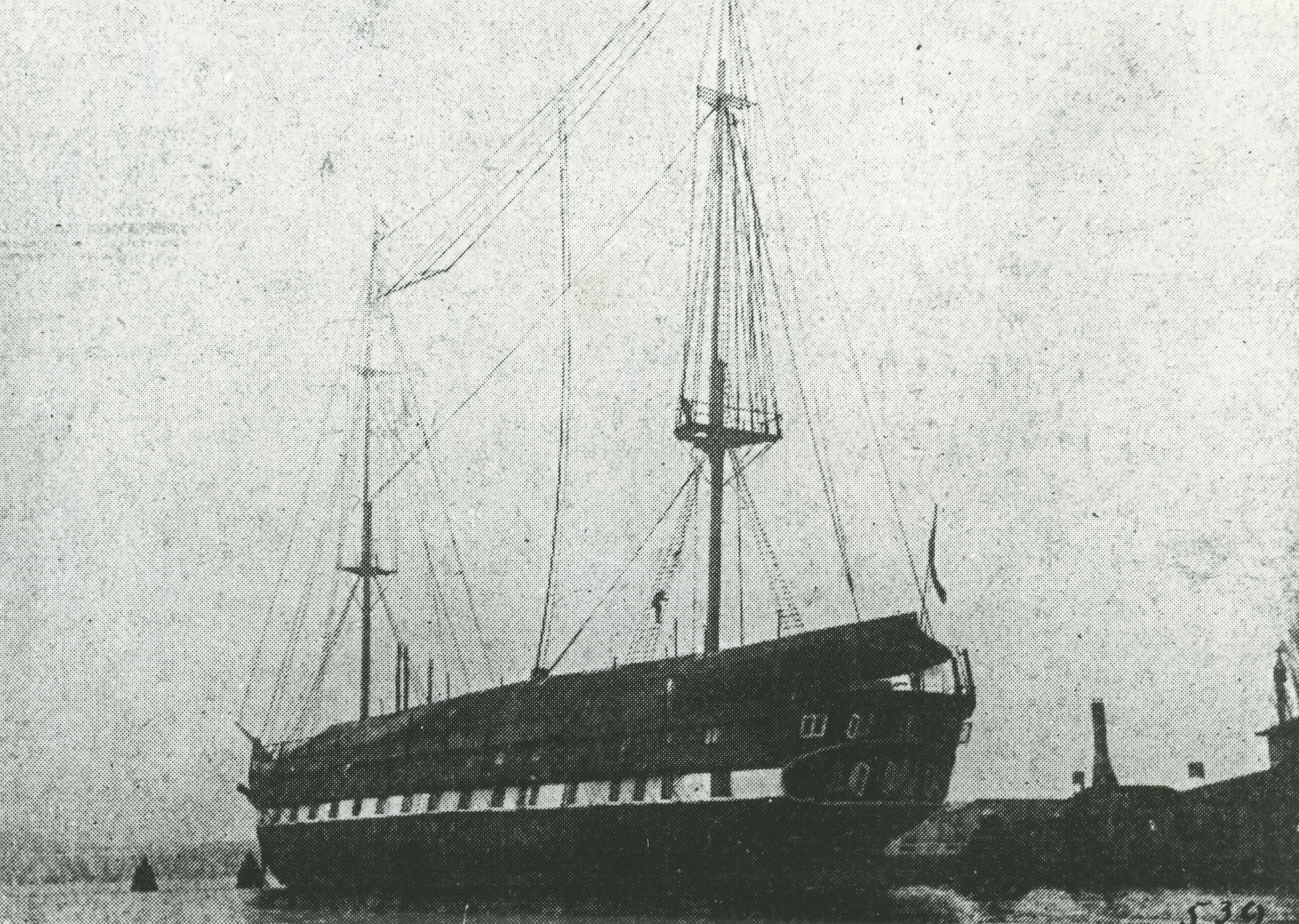
The Wassenaar with a T-antenna between the masts

In fall 1903 the Wassenaar became the center of wireless telegraphy in the Netherlands. In November a 50 meter high mast of the Wassenaar had been equipped with an antenna for wireless telegraphy. The antenna connected to a small wooden building onshore. This early experiment probably did not lead to any serious alterations on the Wassenaar herself. With equipment provided by the Société française des Télégraphes et Téléphones sans fil, a wireless connection was made to the tower of the Bovenkerk in Kampen, a distance of approximately 70 km (43 mi; 38 nmi) primarily over water. The Branly-Popp system was not reliable, and by Christmas 1903 the representatives of the French firm returned home.

The station next started a more successful cooperation with Telefunken, a firm that was prepared to share her knowledge. The telegraphy services of the Wassenaar then expanded quickly. In April 1904 an early success of the station was a successful communication with a station on Heligoland, 300 km away. By August 1904 there were daily communications with Kampen, Groningen, 145 km (90 mi; 78 nmi) away, and Hook of Holland, 70 km (43 mi; 38 nmi) away. In November 1904 the station on the Wassenaar exchanged telegrams with the HNLMS Hertog Hendrik when she made her maiden voyage to the East Indies. It was the first Dutch wireless communication with a ship.

In 1907 a school for signals and wireless telegraphy was housed on the Wassenaar. Somewhere in 1909 the Wassenaar lost its spars. In all probability the removal of the spars and cutting down the main mast were done with the express purpose of making room for a T-antenna. This was probably the situation when on 3 December 1909, a violent storm broke off part of the foremast that held the antenna. The changes did not improve the appearance of the Wassenaar and gave rise to a request that the minister move the Wassenaar to a less conspicuous location.

=== The end ===
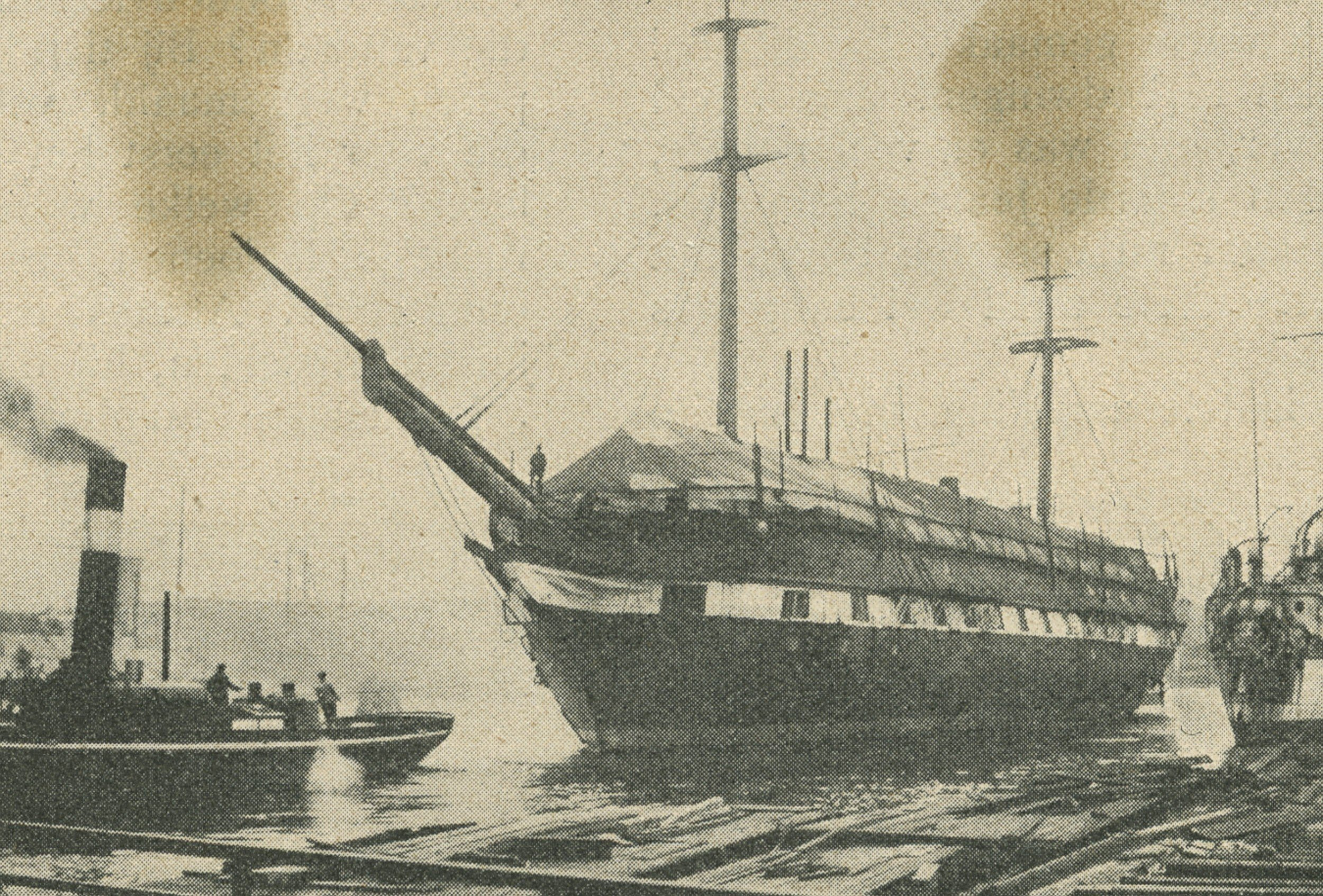
The Wassenaar is towed to the breakers, 1913

In 1911 the government announced plans to sell the Wassenaar. Her staff would be moved to the Marines barracks and funds were requested to erect a couple of telegraphy masts on land. On 30 November 1912 the decision was taken to finally decommission the Wassenaar on 1 January 1913.

The actual decommissioning took place on 31 December 1912. The commander made a short speech about the ship and its role as a first step in the career of so many. He then shouted the order to lower the flag. The boatswain's call sounded, the officers saluted, the marines presented their arms, and the Wassenaar was no longer a warship. Shortly after hundreds of spectators saw two tugboats beginning to tow the Wassenaar to the yard, from where she would be handed over to the breakers.

The official sale would take place on 28 May 1913 together with the protected cruisers Friesland and Utrecht. On 20 Juni the Wassenaar was towed out of Amsterdam. On 11 July she left IJmuiden towed by the Hibernia and Vischploeg and arrived in the Nieuwe Waterweg the same day. She would be broken up in Hendrik-Ido-Ambacht.
