= Willemsoord Dry Dock I =

Historic dry dock in Willemsoord, Den Helder, Netherlands

- Droogdok I (Dutch)
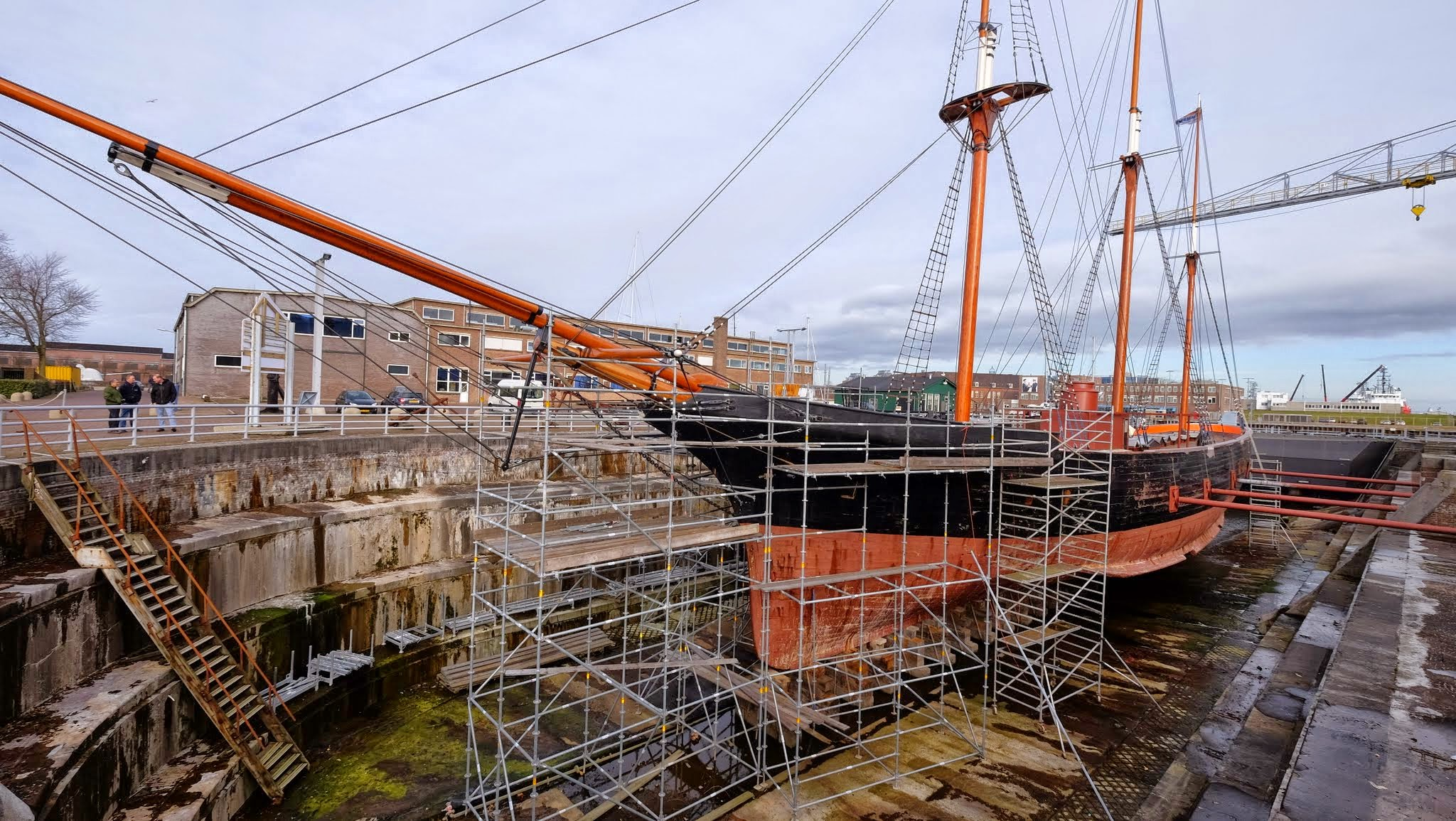
- HNLMS Bonaire in Dry Dock I
- Interactive map of the Willemsoord Dry Dock I area

General information
- Location: Willemsoord 50 1, Willemsoord, Den Helder, Netherlands
- Coordinates: 52.961033°N 4.770690°E
- Construction started: 1812
- Completed: 1822
- Client: Dutch Navy (former)

Design and construction
- Architect: Jan Blanken

Willemsoord Dry Dock I is a historic dry dock in Willemsoord, Den Helder, Netherlands. It was constructed from 1813 till 1822, under the direction of Jan Blanken, and was part of the former Rijkswerf Willemsoord.

== Context ==
=== Nieuwediep ===
In 1781-1785 the harbor of Nieuwediep was created just east of Den Helder. It was meant for heavy warships, which had trouble reaching their home towns on the Zuiderzee. These home towns (like Amsterdam) vehemently opposed the construction of a competing harbor, and wanted Nieuwediep's function to remain strictly limited to harboring heavy warships. Nevertheless, from 1792 onward, some field fortifications were made to protect the harbor. A careening facility called Het Nieuwe Werk or Kielplaats was also created. Here ships could enter at high tide, be put on their side at low tide and careen while a lock door prevented the flood from returning. The 1799 the Anglo-Russian invasion of Holland led to the capture of the base at Nieuwediep and the surrender of the cornered Dutch fleet in the Vlieter incident.

=== Naval base Willemsoord ===
In 1811 Napoleon visited Nieuwediep and ordered the construction of a large well-fortified navy base. The fortifications would center on Den Helder, giving rise to the town of that name. The new navy base would be east of Den Helder, on the west side of the Nieuwediep, north of the Nieuwe Werk. The new navy base would later become known as Willemsoord, or Rijkswerf Willemsoord. Napoleon gave the order to design the new base to Jan Blanken. He was an engineer who had proved very effective in improving the navy base at Hellevoetsluis, and in designing the Hellevoetsluis Dry Dock.

Jan Blanken's design included a sea lock, a wet dock and a dry dock. The sea lock closed the wet dock from the tides. The wet dock provided safe anchorage, but its prime benefit was that ships stayed at the same height to the quays. They could also be brought in closer. It all led to easier handling and storage of ships. A dry dock was a facility that had recently become a necessity for any serious naval base. Heavy warships had become longer, and therefore more susceptible to damage from careening. Meanwhile, the problematic supply of good Scandinavian oak, and the practice of copper sheathing ships, had increased the demand for frequent below water maintenance.

== Construction History ==
=== Foundations for the pumphouse ===
1838 Map

In 1813 construction of the pump building started with digging a pit for its foundation. Soon, quicksand and water seemed to have joined forces to prevent construction. However, perseverance prevailed and digging reached the required depth. Thirty piles were then driven into the ground, and work for that year was finished.

After the liberation, work on the pumphouse foundation was picked up again in 1816. The pit was pumped dry, and dug out again. However, the piles were nowhere to be found. They could neither be dug up, nor could they be found by exploring with iron sounding devices called peilijzers. The pit was kept dry by using three chain pumps, working round the clock. Suddenly, a well of 1 m diameter burst open. It filled the pit so quickly that the drivers of the horses that drove the chain mills had to cut the horses loose in order to save them. Jan Blanken was then Inspector-General of Rijkswaterstaat. He was assisted by the engineers Glimmerveen, Van Asperen and Wellenberg, and the later chief-engineer A. Greve, as well as the contractors Den Stok and Verschuur. They decided to continue construction at the same location, instead of changing the plans. After a lot of pumping, the well became visible. It continued to expel shells and water, and when a 36 feet pile was driven into it, it was launched like an arrow.

The well was stopped by layers of horse manure, rubble and other objects. Of course this was a stop gap measure, but at least the pit could be kept dry. The idea of pile driving was abandoned. Heavy fir beams were now laid down about 80 cm apart. The openings were closed by brickwork. Across this layer, a new layer of heavy fir beams was laid down, and closed by bricks. Any resulting depressions were again levelled by brickwork, and so a level foundation for the pumphouse was created.

=== Foundations of the dry dock ===
Dry dock design Drawing

In April 1817, digging the pit for the dry dock was tendered together with digging a stretch of the wet dock from the sea lock to the dry dock. The order also included delivery of 5,000 oak and other piles, as well as 30,000 feet of related planks. The circumstances in the dock proved even worse than below the pump building. Three chain pumps worked day and night against a sea of sand, and 30 very pricey work horses worked themselves to death in spite of heavy feeding. The area was so wet and sandy that the sides of the pit were level like beaches. In spite of this, pile driving succeeded, and with enormous difficulties, connecting beams were attached to form the floor. It had to be levelled by hacking and filling up. The big plus of finishing this floor was that the quicksand was stopped from coming up.

=== Brick work of the dry dock ===
The dry dock itself was made of brick with stone details. In April 1817 6,124 cubic feet of Petit Granit from Écaussinnes (blue stone) was ordered for the dry dock and the sea lock combined. In September 1819 and October 1820 it was noted that foundation planks and brickwork at the lower levels of the dock had been pushed upwards. As a counter measure 300 lasts (probably 600 ton) of iron ballast was placed on top of these. In between these events, on 12 May 1820, the further works and completion of the brick side walls of the dry dock were tendered. In July 1822 the dock was dry, and 23 feet below high tide workers were making the blocks and other facilities to receive ships.

=== Pumphouse and Steam Engine ===
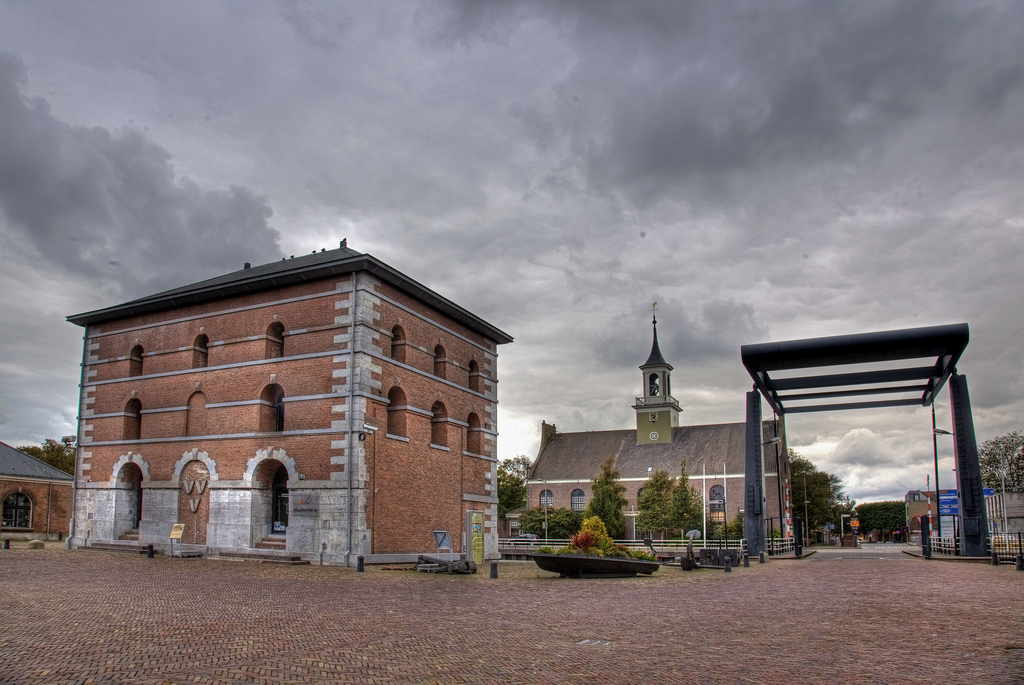
Stoommachinegebouw

The pumphouse, later known as Steam Engine Building I, was built just west of the dry dock. It housed the steam engine and pumps, and was designed by Jan Blanken in neo-classical style. Its steam would drive 9 cylindrical pumps to quickly empty dry dock I. A subterraneous sewer connected the building to the dry dock. As the name implies this sewer was in the center line, just below dock, making that all water flowed into this sewer.

In April 1817 the rest of the pump building, and foundation for, and completion of brick sewers towards the still to be made dry dock was tendered. The building was finished by late September 1818.

The first steam engine of the dry dock was made by Dieudonné Forir in Liège. It would soon prove a failure. In 1822 the machine was inspected by Watt, but when it was found not worthy of repair, Boulton and Watt delivered a new engine in 1823.

=== Ship Caisson ===
The dry dock was closed by a ship caisson. This had been built at Rijkswerf Medemblik. After launch it had been transported on ship camels to the Vlieter in 8 days. From there it was towed to Nieuwediep by two tugs, and arrived there on 29 June 1822. On 6 July the floating door was put in place in the dry dock, and was shown to fit very well. The door was later replaced.

== First Service (1822-1849) ==
=== First use ===
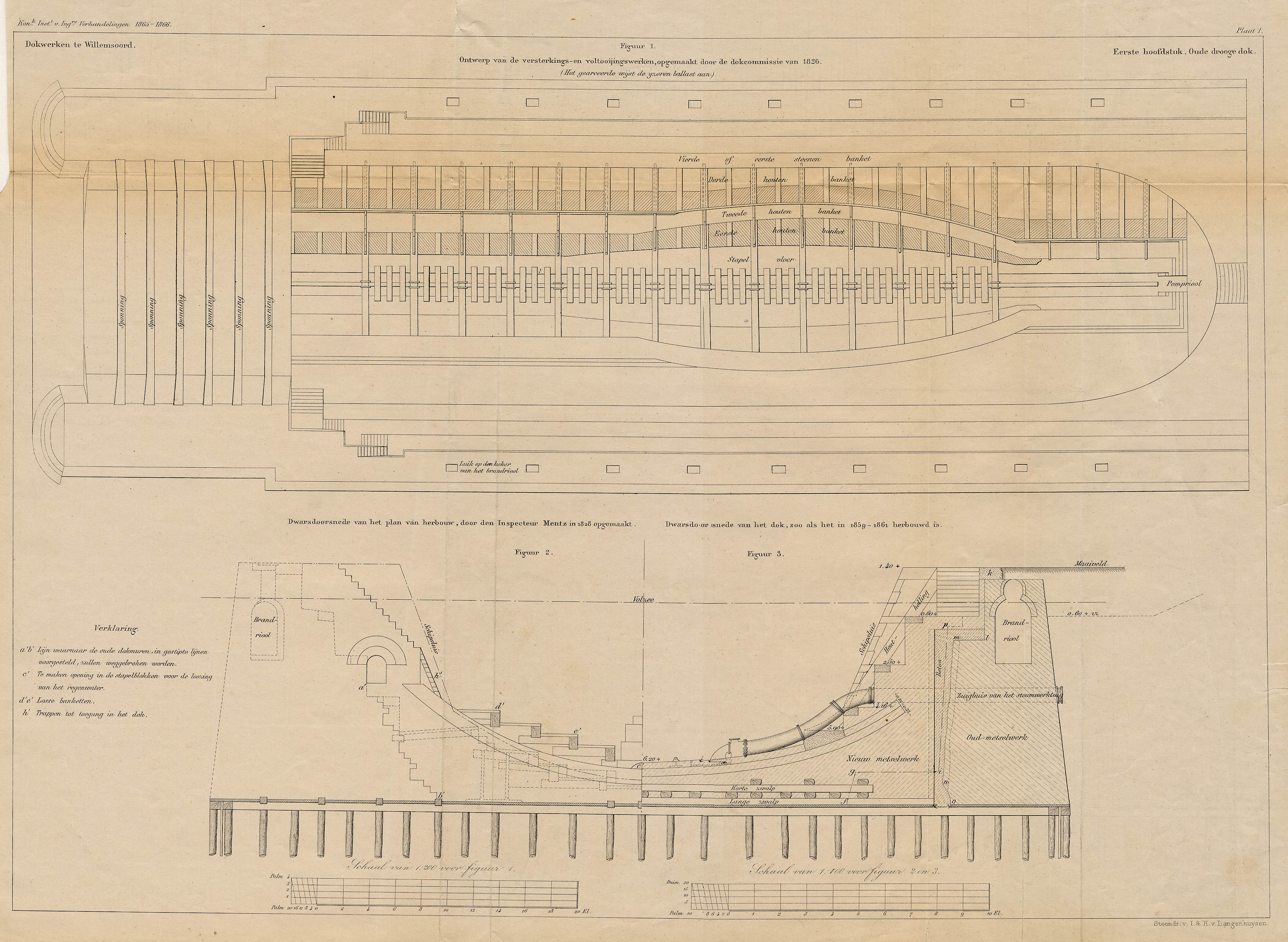
Willemsoord Dock I Fig 1 work by the 1826 commission

On 13 July 1822 the ship of the line Willem I (formerly Couronne) of 74 guns was successfully placed in the dry dock. After the water was pumped out, the Willem I stood on the bottom of the dock with all its weight. Authorities were very pleased that they had now proven that the foundation could withstand the weight concentrated in the keel, and did not rift and become leaky because of pressures like had happened in France and in England in such situations.

These early reports would later prove to be way too optimistic. Already in 1821 it was noted that lower terraces and foundations were getting pushed up. Furthermore, it was noted that when the dock was empty, it rose and fell with the tide. The obvious conclusion was that the well was still working, and was connected to the sea. The power of the water was so strong that, while Willem I was in the dock, the floor was lifted 8 cm, proving that her weight did not make any difference.

=== Investigation and plans to solve the problem ===
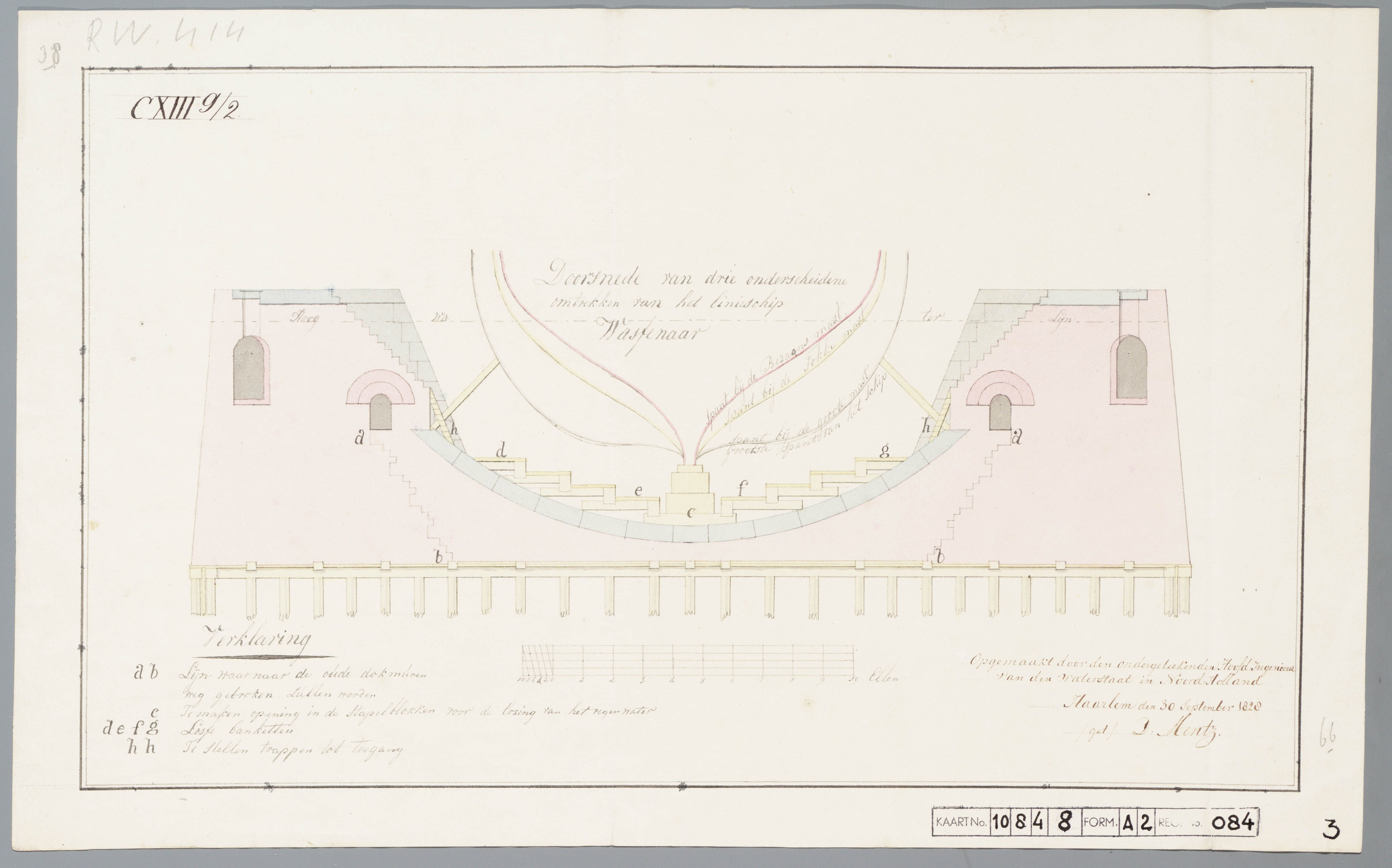
1828 drawing by D. Mentz showing his proposal

In 1826 a commission under J. Blanken, including Captain-lt N.A. de Vries, naval constructor P. Schuyt, and deputy-constructor J. Landstraat made a report. They noted that in 5 years of operation, 6 warships had used the dry dock, and that its situation had not degraded. Furthermore, that as long a ship was in the dock, or it was filled with water of at least 2.51 m - 2.83 m high, there was no problem. However, when the dock was emptied, the well below the surface started to push up the dock for 9.4 cm, at the place where the mizzen-mast of a docking ship would be. (Note that the weight of the water in the dock, or a docking ship thus tended to keep the floor in place.)

The 1826 commission obviously found the problem serious enough. It the proposed to fix the problem by laying 26 oak beams of 52 and 63 cm diameter on the floor of the dock, perpendicular to its length. These would have to be clamped to the foundation planks by iron braces, and to be connected to each other below the brickwork. These beams would then have to be walled up with brick, and an oak plank floor laid over these. The cost of these repairs was estimated at 59,297 guilders (see Fig. 1).

In June 1827 the repair job was offered to contractor A. Korf in Den Helder. He demanded 129,642 guilders to do the work, and made other demands that led to the job getting postponed. In 1829 a totally different plan was made chief engineer D. Mentz. It proposed to break out the part of the dry dock between the walls, and then to build a brick inverted arc in the dry dock for an estimated 355,000 guilders (see 1828 drawing). In April 1830 the government decided to execute the Mentz plan in 1832. By December 1830 the estimate had increased to 399,949 guilders.

By 1832 the Dutch financial situation had become so desperate that the Mentz plan came to nothing. Actually nothing would be done till 1853. What was done, was that the ballast placed inside the dock was steadily increased to 653 last of iron (see Fig. 1).

=== Regular operation ===
In spite of leakages, Dry Dock I continued in use till 1849. From 1822 till 1849, it served without interruption, docking 120 ships in 27 years. In September 1848 the frigates HNLMS Prins van Oranje (60) and Sambre (44) were serviced in 5 days, with their full armament on board.

During investigations in 1849 and 1857 no traces or repairs were found, and so one could assume that not much was, or had to be, spent on maintenance.

=== The dock is shut down (1849) ===
The caisson door lock of the dry dock was first to show serious trouble. In 1838 it had been so much deformed, that the ship caisson did not fit anymore. The old ship caisson was then stored in the dock, and a new ship caisson that fit the deformed lock was made. This new caisson had the serious disadvantage that it could not be turned around for cleaning and maintenance.

In April 1849, the razeed frigate Algiers was in dock, when so much water passed the door, that the dock could not be made dry again. This put an end to the service of the dock.

== Failed repair, investigation and Rebuild (1850-1861) ==
=== Failed attempt to repair the caisson lock ===
After the dock had become unserviceable, the naval minister requested to increase the 1849 navy budget by 20,000 guilders, so the problem could be investigated. In 1850 a dam was constructed in the wet dock for 18,827 guilders. In 1851 a budget law for 155,000 to rebuild the lock was defeated, but in 1852 the sum was granted. In 1853 and 1854 the lock of the dry dock was then rebuild for 177,366 guilders. Observations during the repairs looked very positive. When the rebuild of the lock was finished, the dam was removed, and the ship caisson put in place. However, when the pumps were started, it proved impossible to empty the dry dock further than 3.5 m below sea level.

The conclusion of the failure to make the dock dry was obvious: there was a subterranean connection between the dry dock and the water outside the lock. In December 1854, a 8.40 m long screen of 12 m long piles was then driven into the ground north of the lock. A new attempt to pump the dock dry got significantly further, but revealed that a like situation existed south of the lock. So, a second screen was driven into the ground south of the lock. Another attempt to empty the dock found that this was still not sufficient.

Most of the time, Algiers had remained in the dry dock. In September 1853 she was sold for breakup while still standing in the dry dock.

=== Decision to build a new, larger dry dock ===
In February 1855 a commission led by Van der Kun was then ordered to report about possible further action. The commission proposed to build a new large dry dock at the south west corner of the wet dock (Dry Dock II). Final repairs to Dry Dock I would follow after completion of the new dock. Meanwhile, the commission proposed to experiment with lengthening the screens near the Dry Dock I's ship caisson lock. During the discussions about the 1855 budget, the Secretary for the Navy proposed to follow the advice of the new commission, which was approved. The subsequent lengthening of the screens was found to be insufficient.

=== Investigation (1857-1858) ===
The budget for 1857 then got a post of 25,000 guilders for making a dam and pumping the water out of the dry dock in order to investigate the situation. In June 1857 the dock was emptied and an investigation started. It proved that water was indeed streaming under, or along the sides of the repaired lock. The findings of the commission were presented on 16 July 1857. It found that near the middle of the dock, the lower steps had been pushed up 51 cm on the north side and 62 cm on the south side. From the center to the lock side, all steps and floors had been moved out of position. Near the lock, there was an opening in the dock floor of 1.30 m long and up to 7 cm wide, which was the main leak. It led to the conclusion that the condition of the dry dock had seriously worsened since the rebuilt of the caisson lock. Another finding was that the brickwork, made by use of the mortar 'Amsterdam artificial cement' was loose in many places.

The commission deemed it necessary to demolish all loose brickwork, and to remove the ballast before being able to give a sound advice. In September 1857 demolition of all loose brick work and woodwork started. On 23 February 1858 the commission was able to report that the floor of the dock on the lock side was in a terrible condition. About 30 m had been lifted from its foundation, sometimes as high as 50 cm. The space in between had been filled with sand and sea weed and the like. The inner layers of brick were solid, but those exposed to daylight were loose. Again, the bad quality of the mortar that had been used was noted. The final conclusion was that the condition of the dock had been caused by the carelessly made and loose foundations, and the mandatory use of Amsterdam Artificial Mortar. The commission noted that contemporary limits to pump capacity would have influenced construction.

=== Rebuild ===
To its 23 February 1858 report the commission also attached a preliminary design for rebuilding the dock on the existing foundations. There were two versions, one that would re-use the original caisson door, and a second plan that would require a new door. The first plan would cost 345,000 guilders, and the second 349,000. Now that the commission had found clear causes for the trouble with the drydock, it was a lot more positive about rebuilding it. On 6 August 1858, it also reported about the financial side. It said that the value of an operational dock would be 730,000, and so subtracting 349,000, the current value of the drydock was 381,000 guilders. It would therefore be unwise to build a completely new dock, for which space was lacking at Nieuwediep.

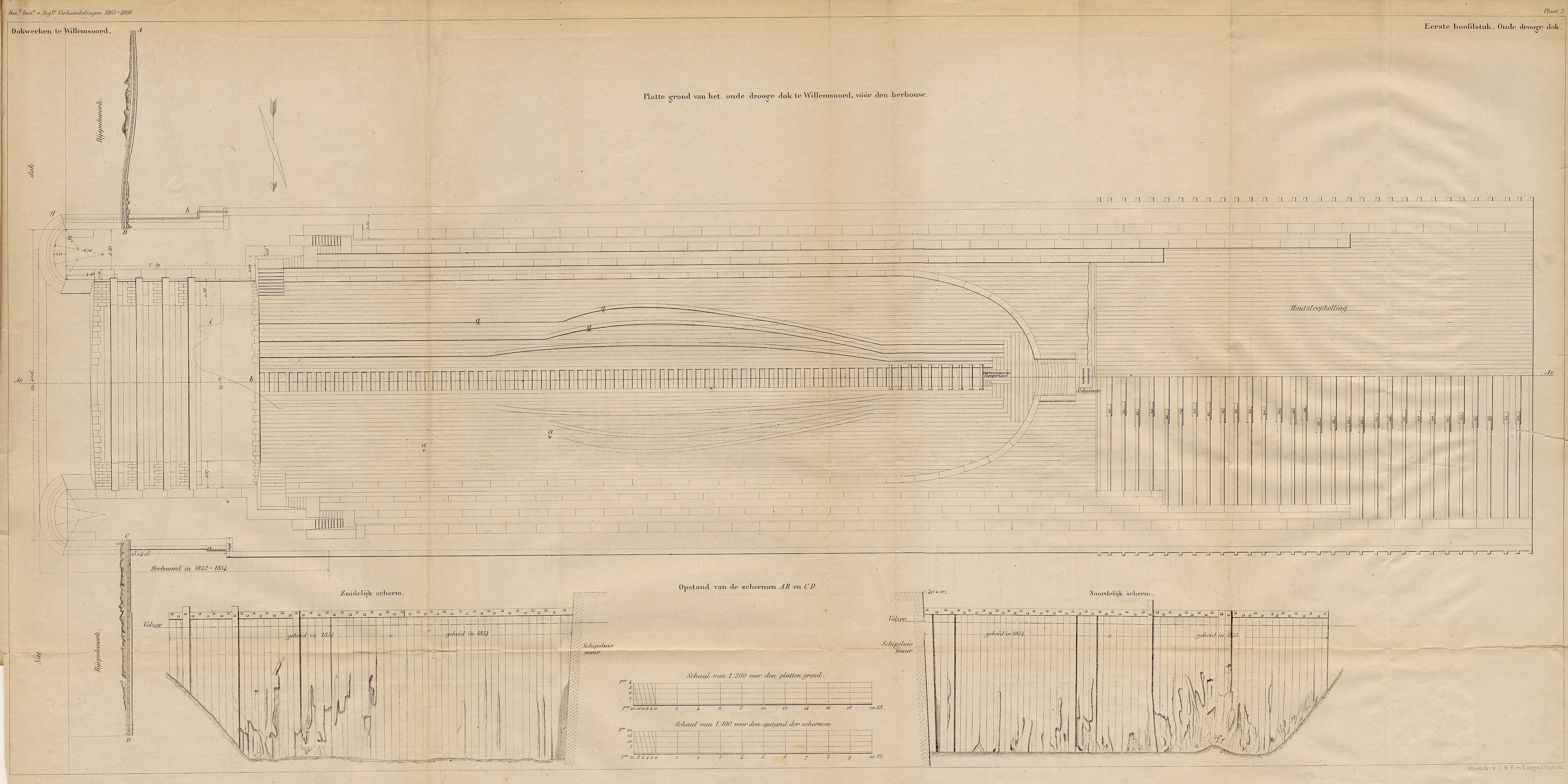
Willemsoord Dock I Fig 2 Floor plan in 1857–1858 with damaged parts and screens

The minister for the navy then vigorously promoted funding the reconstruction in the 1859 Navy budget. The House of Representatives, which had been very adverse to spending more money on Dry Dock I, was now convinced, and voted 116,000 guilders for the first year.

On 17 January 1859 the required fir and oak nails for the rebuild were tendered. The initial option to re-use the first ship caisson was abandoned, because the lines of the lock would be changed, and contemporary ship caissons had a single keel, so it was not wise to re-use the first ship caisson. It was subsequently demolished. The second asymmetrical ship caisson was auctioned.

On 14 March 1859 the rebuild of Willemsoord Dry Dock I was tendered, and subsequently awarded to the lowest bidder. He started work on 17 March. The contractor soon found why one the screens had not been effective: they were found to be good on top, but shattered and very open at the bottom (Fig 2, lower half). The demolition of the dock confirmed everything the commission had noted. The brickwork of the dock was removed easily. On the contrary the brickwork of the recently rebuilt lock proved to be hard, well done and solid all around.

In early June 1859 the foundations had been cleared till the fir floor. Now the 'Kespen', which connected the floor to the piles, where re-attached to the piles in most places. Some piles were to deep, and their heads, were filled up to attach the 'Kesps'. This way the floor was re-attached to the foundation piles.

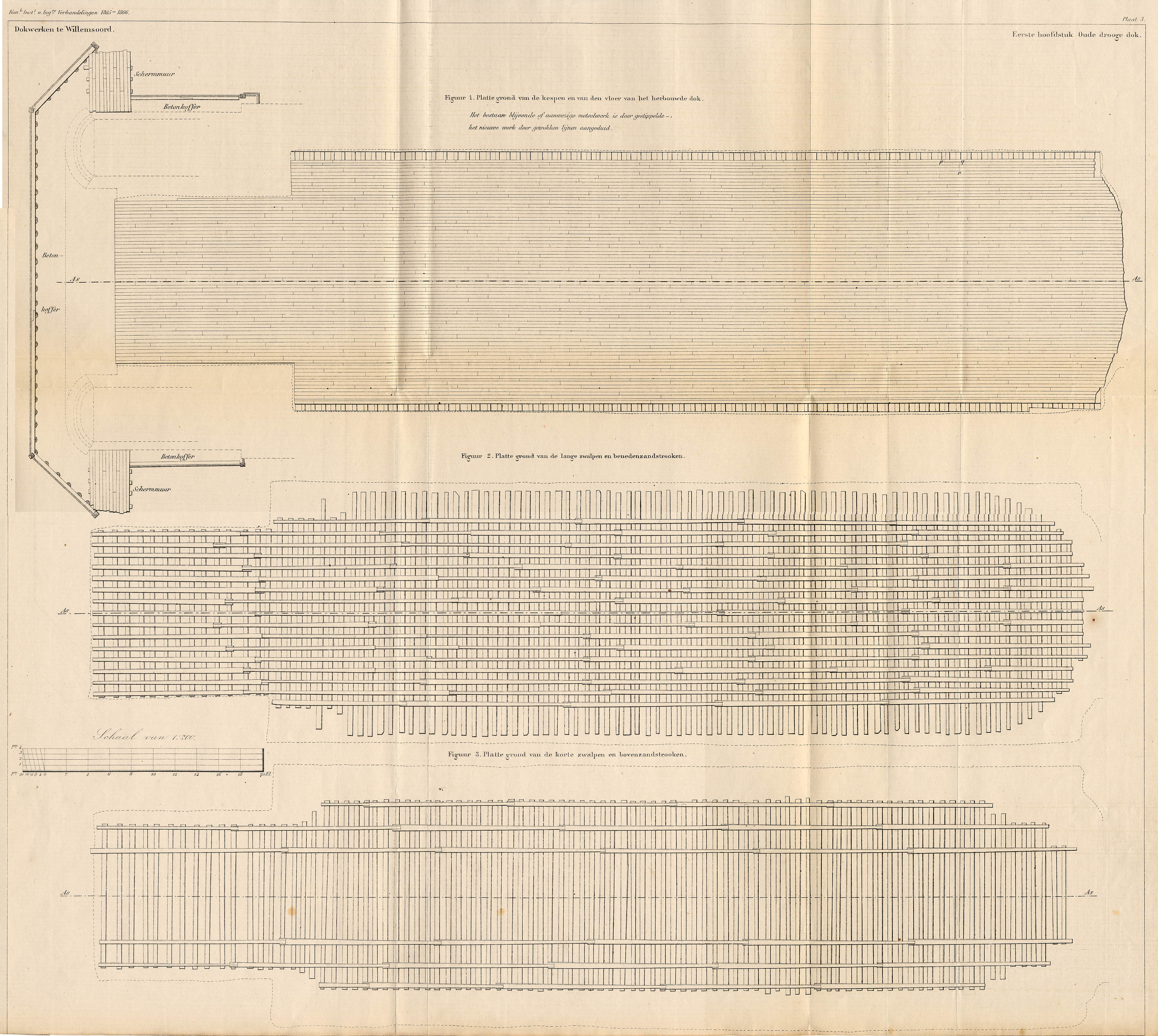
Willemsoord Dock I Fig 3 Floor plans, the coffer top left

Fixing the leakage problem near the caisson lock was a different task. For that, a concrete coffer was built around the outside of the caisson lock. The wooden screens which had failed to stop the leakage were also replaced. Both were established on a new foundation which was prolonged to the bottom of the lock. The concrete coffer was to form one structure with the foundations of the lock. During these works, a fir floor was discovered below the kesps of the lock. In view of the leakage at this place the managers of the works decided to have it removed. Below this floor up to 1.5–2 m of ground then proved to have been washed away. Next it was found that below the southern lock walls most ground had also disappeared. The course of the water on the southern leak had now clearly been established to have followed the route (Fig. 2 line g, h, i, b). Next 332 m^{3} of sand was pushed below these structures using very long pestles. Next a coffer was driven into the ground on the backside of the lock walls. In late August this was filled up with concrete (Fig. 3 fig. 1).

By late August two layers of fir beams had been laid down at right angles and attached to the foundations. This fir matrix was extended from the dock into the caisson lock. The immediate objective was to make a solid attachment between the heavy foundations of the dock, and those of the lock (Figure 3). The contractor was by then so much ahead of schedule, that he started the work planned for 1860: Completing the work kuip below the inverted arc of the drydock, completing the screenwalls to the required height (Fig. 4 Scherm- muur), and completing the concrete coffer before the dry dock. The Formwork for the work below the inverted arc was soon made, and by late October this was finished. Filling the coffer was completed on 31 October. After the screen walls had been brought to the required height, the last steam engine that kept the works dry was stopped, and work stopped for that year. The water level in the dry dock then rose to about the same level as in the Afsluitingskanaal (see 1838 map). The only work done in winter was making the stone from the previous construction ready for re-use. Thus all work projected for 1860, had already been done in 1859.

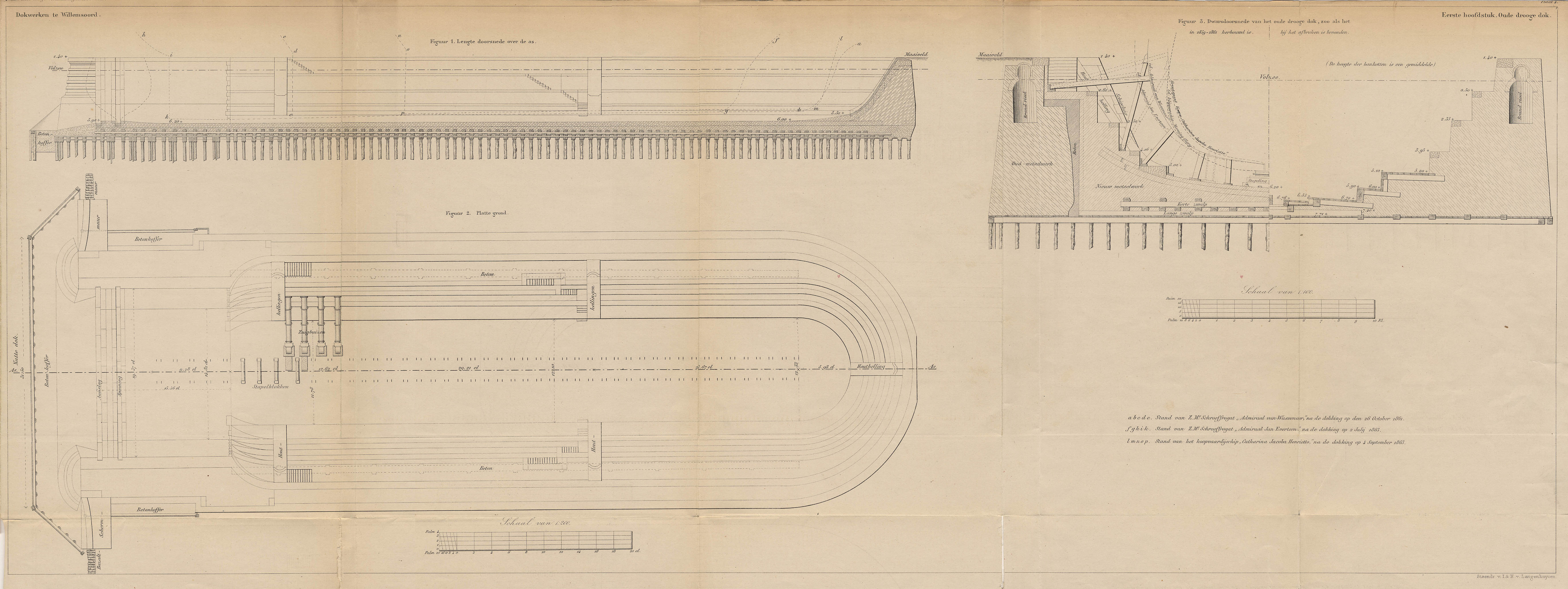
Willemsoord Dock I Fig 4 Drydock I after rebuilt.

The contractor then got permission to do the 1861 work in 1860. On 23 March 1860 a steam engine then started to make the dry dock dry again. Now the southern inner wall of the lock was removed to give it the same grade as the northern wall. The place for the ship caisson was also moved towards the wet dock as much as possible. This increased the length of the dock that could be used by ships by 7 m for special cases. If the door was in the single remaining rabbet, usable length would be 74.5 m. If the ship caisson was pressed against the rabbet, this would become 76.75 m.

In late April 1860 the masonry of the first inverted arc (fig. 3 Figuur 3 Dwarsdoorsnede, at 0.33), thick 1.5 bricks was commenced. The central sewer was also removed. In early May concrete was poured between the old and new masonry (Fig. 1, Figuur 3, l, m, n, o, i, p), till the level of the inverted arc. In places patented Portland cement had to be added to the concrete. In late May the masonry of the second layer of the inverted arc started. It was one brick thick.(fig. 3 Figuur 3 Dwarsdoorsnede, at 0.22) This contained eye bolts that kept the wooden blocks from floating upwards when the dock was filled.

By mid-June the first part of the second layer of the inverted arc had been completed. Now the masonry of the facings of the inner lock walls was started. The northern screen wall was also heightened. In late June heightening the southern screen wall started. Construction of the lowest step banket also started. This was made entirely of stone and placed at the upper end of the lowest part of the second layer of the inverted arc. Next the upper part of the second layer of the inverted arc was started, as well as the brickwork for the higher steps. These higher steps would be made of brick covered with stone. Practically all the stone of the previous work was re-used.

In the night of 4–5 August 1860 the dam near the land side lock (Keersluis, see 1838 map) of the wet dock was broken. It flooded the dry dock. At the end of August the wet dock, and the dry dock were dry again. By half September the masonry of the dock was completed so far, that pouring concrete between this new masonry and the old brickwork was resumed. In late October the last brick was laid. At the end of 1860 the only work left was some cleaning, and placing some large stone slabs which had not yet arrived.

=== The new ship caisson ===
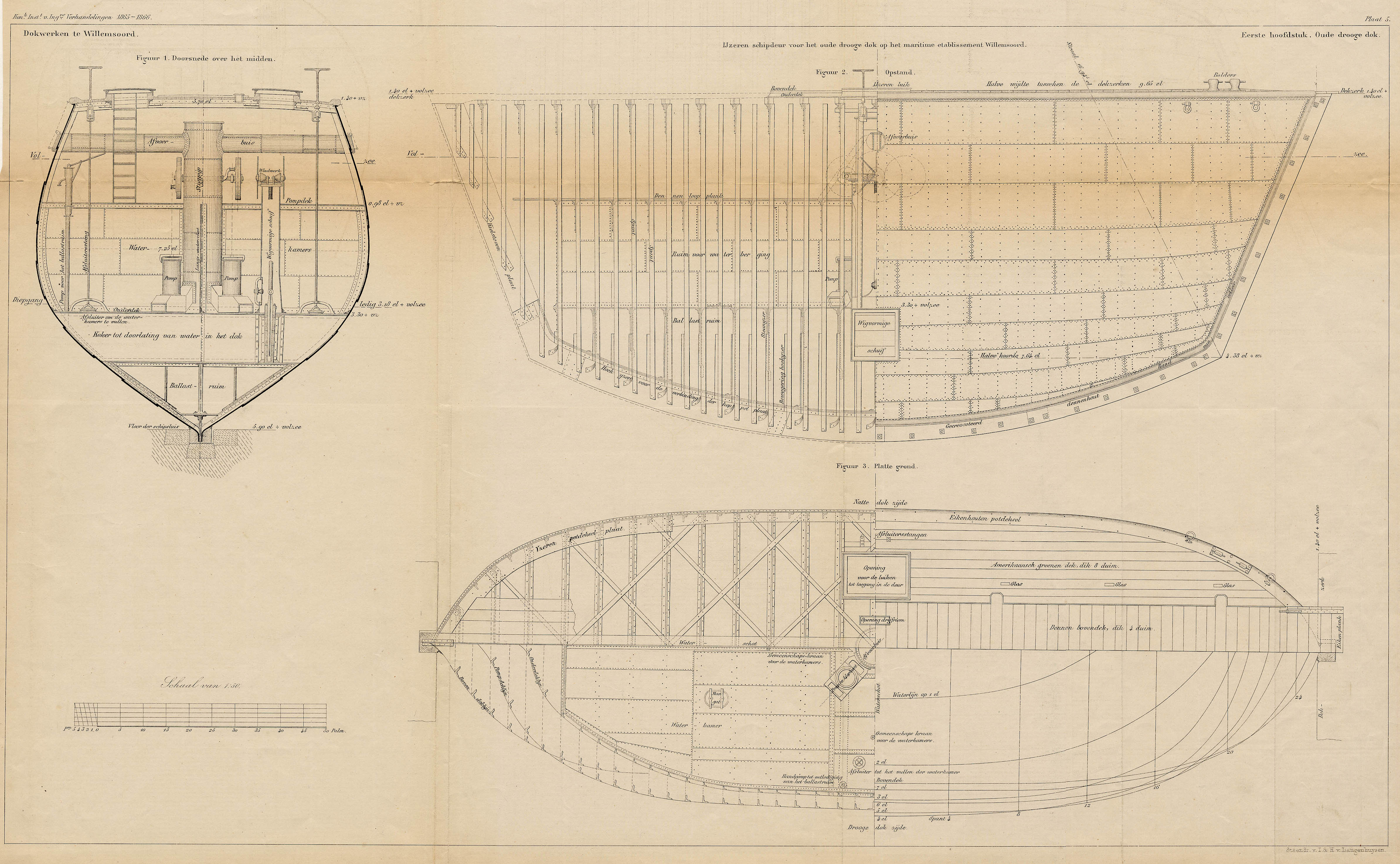
Willemsoord Dock I Fig 5 iron ship caisson

After it proved unfeasible to use the first ship caisson, which had been in storage for a long time, a new ship caisson was ordered. It was built according to a new model from England. It had only one keel, instead of two. It was made completely of iron, which was very useful against Shipworms. Construction was tendered on 21 March 1860. It had to be delivered in 7 months, but bad weather caused much delay. More speed would not have mattered anyway, because the deepening of the wet dock, and the removal of the dam for the Keersluis, were not ready before Spring 1861.

On 15 December 1860 the ship caisson was launched. It had balance gates to open and close a canal which led through the door towards the drydock. Iron gate valves were made to let water into the door (Fig. 6, Figuur 4–7). To get the water out of the door again, four pumps (Fig. 6, Figuur 1–3) were present. A locomobile of 6 hp would drive the pumps and achieve this in 22 minutes. Total weight of the door was 122,513 kg of which 103,537 kg iron.

On 7 April 1861 a tugboat tugged the ship caisson from Hellevoetsluis to the North Sea, arriving in Willemsoord on 8 April. After the required ballast had been placed, she was put in place and tested. Everything worked, except for the balance gates. An attempt to repair this failed, and so the door was quite leaky. It was nevertheless taken into use as it was in October 1861.

=== Pumphouse II is taken into use ===
The decision to build the new and larger Willemsoord Dry Dock II included a decision to build a new pumphouse, that would serve both docks, near Dry Dock II. A test to empty the dock failed on 22 May 1861. It was found that all tubing near the new pump building had been broken. After this was fixed, the rebuilt drydock was pumped dry on 9 September 1861. It meant that Pumphouse II was used successfully by Dry Dock I before Dry Dock got to use it. When the dock was dry, the navy started to place the blocks on the axis of the dock floor.

The last attempted use of pumphouse I had been after the dam was broken in 1860, but by then sewer had already been walled up, and so the attempt had failed. The steam engine of Pumphouse I was sold in November 1860. The building was later converted to store ironware, and wheat for the naval bakery on the upper levels. In 1889 the lower levels were also converted to wheat stores. It earned it the name graanpakhuis, meaning 'wheat storagehouse'.

== In Service again (1861) ==
=== First ships using the rebuilt dry dock ===
The steam frigate HNLMS Wassenaar was the first ship to use the rebuilt drydock on 26 October 1861. For the docking it had been totally emptied. Its rigging had been removed, but the masts remained in place. Boilers and machinery remained on board, which was very important. 28 tons of ballast had been put near the bow to get the keel level. Draft was then 4.44 m fore and 4.57 m aft. The blocks were high 0.77 m to 1.05 m, so there was from 4.515 m to 4.935 m of water above them. There was 7.25 m of space left between the rudder axis and the inside of the lock door. The maximum length of a docking ship was then estimated to be 16.45 m more, and a draft of 5.5 m would be possible at high tide.

The procedure to dock started at 8:10 AM by opening the balance gate in the ship caisson; filling the drydock in 40 minutes till the water level in the wet dock; 44 cm below high tide. The locomobile then brought the pumps of the ship caisson in action, lifting it out of position. At 9:45 AM the ship caisson was moored in the wet dock, and the dry dock was accessible. At 10:30 AM Wassenaar was in the drydock. After the ship caisson had been replaced, the steam engines of the drydock started to work on four pumps at 12:07 PM. At 12:25 the first beams were lowered to keep Wassenaar in place. From 12:50 to 14:45 pumping continued, till two pumps were disengaged. From 14:57 only two pumps continued till 16:10, when Wassenaar stood dry.

=== An overview of some of the first ships to use the rebuilt dock ===
No.	type	Name	draft	length	entered	entered	# days
1	Frigate with aux. power	Wassenaar	4.57 m	62.36 m	25 October 1861	6 June 1862	224
2	Sailing Corvette	Heldin	4.30 m	39.50 m	28 June 1862	30 June 1862	2
3	Sailing frigate 2nd class	Prins Alexander	4.97 m	46.21 m	3 July 1862	7 October 1862	70
7	Frigate with aux. power	Evertsen	5.76 m	63.5 m	1 July 1863	30 July 1863	29
10	Screw Corvette	Metalen Kruis	4.03 m	58.00 m	1 October 1863	6 October 1863	5
12	Screw Corvette	Metalen Kruis	5.40 m	58.00 m	30 November 1863	5 December 1863	5

There is good 1866 summary of the capacities of the drydock after the 1861 rebuilt. It was said, that of the then existing types of ships, the heaviest, i.e. the frigates with auxiliary power: Wassenaar, Evertsen and Zeeland, could use the dock after unloading everything but the boilers and engines. This was not ideal, but it was an acceptable way to dock. The second type of ships, the screw corvettes Schroefstoomschepen tweede klas, and all smaller ships were able to use it while fully loaded. This was of course the most efficient way of docking.

The table with the drafts of the ships as they docked, supports the 1866 summary. It also shows the screw corvette Metalen Kruis using the dock while empty and while loaded. The table furthermore highlights another aspect of the rebuild. It shows that screw ships were much longer than their sailing counterparts (Metalen Kruis vs. Prins Alexander). Therefore, for drydocks, screw propulsion meant that the desirable length to depth ratio changed in favor of length. Thus it becomes understandable that the designers of the rebuild were eager to make the dock longer (from 67.50 m to 76.35 m), and where bothered less by it becoming shallower (7.22 m 6.2 m).

=== Fixing the ship caisson ===
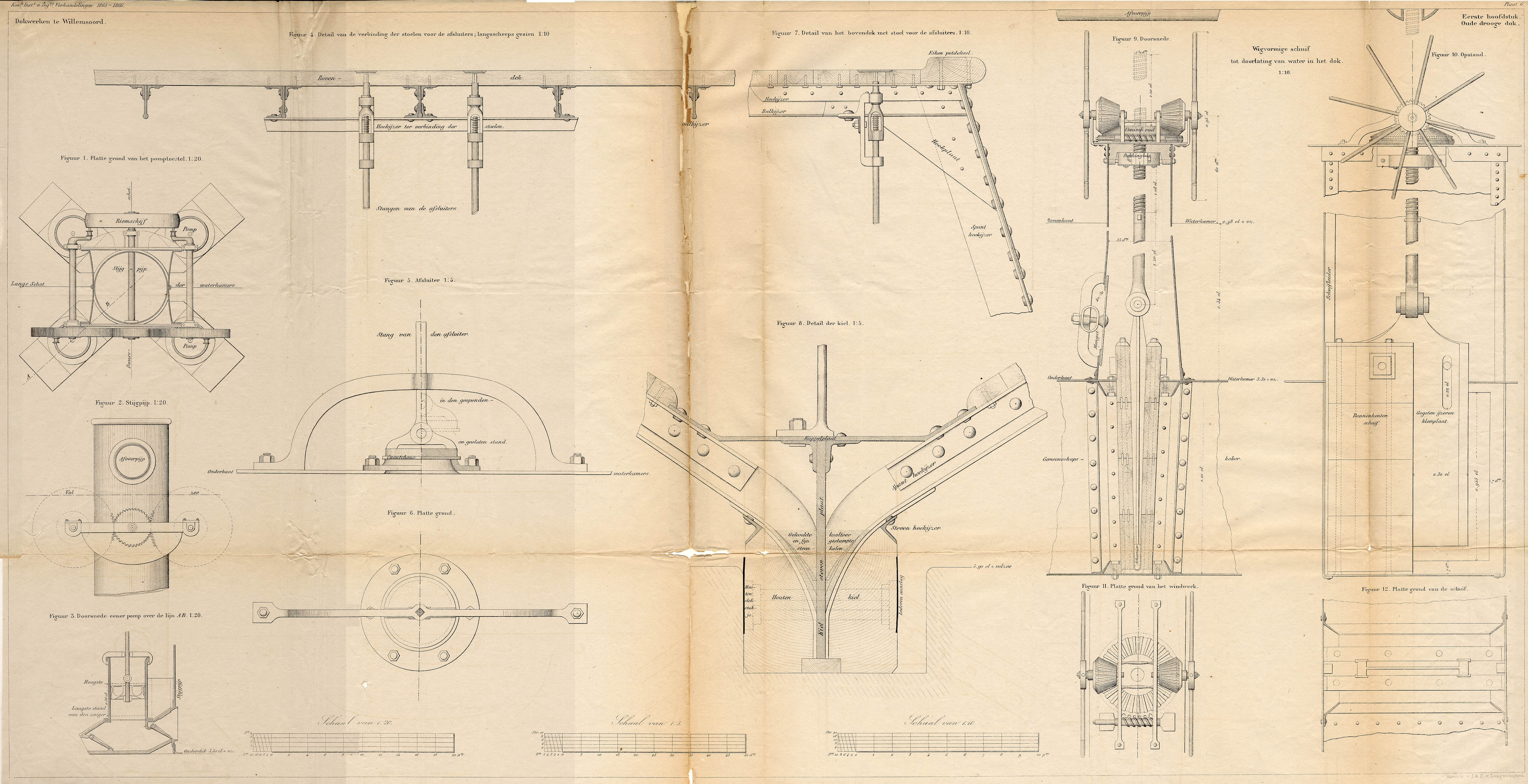
Willemsoord Dock I Fig 6 depicting ship caisson details

By August 1862 a small change had been made to the caisson door. Two of her pumps had been adapted so they could be used to drain leakage and other water (primarily rain) that collected daily in the drydock. The reason was that using the dry dock machinery for this was not economical.

Apart from the problems with the balance gates, there was also leakage on the keel and sides of the caisson, where the door met the walls of the lock. The situation with the door was not acceptable, but nothing much could be done, while first the frigate HNLMS Wassenaar was in the dock from 25 October 1861 till 6 June 1862, and then three others till 18 October 1862.

When the opportunity arose, the door was careened from October 1862 till February 1863. The balance gates still leaked after this, and so one of these was replaced by a slide (Fig. 6, Figuur 9-12) in May 1863. This proved to be the solution to the problems with the balance gates.

=== Further service ===
The dry dock received Wassenaar for the first time with only her boilers and engines in place, and a draft of only 4.57 m. This might have been the designed capability of the drydock with regard to steam frigates. Nevertheless, the draft of Evertsen was 5.76 m when she entered the dock, even though her standard draft was only 0.5 m more than that of Wassenaar. From 25 to 27 July 1864, the Evertsen-class frigate Zeeland was in Dry Dock I. Zeeland was stated to have been in dock with a draft of 5.7 m, and with its full armament on board. This is still something much different than receiving fully loaded steam frigates, but being able to keep the armament on board made a huge difference.

When Zeeland left the dock, it was thought that the significantly longer Adolf van Nassau would next visit Dock I, before leaving for the East Indies. This was 'expected', because of how deep the fully armed Zeeland (of the same draft) had been. It did not happen, and was probably unlikely, as it would mean unloading most of the stores (water, coal, luggage etc.) of Adolf van Nassau. However, the thought points to the possibility of Adolf using the lengthened useful area of the dock floor.

Later, the handling of heavy frigates seems to have become routine. In February 1866 Zeeland left the drydock, while on 20 March 1866 Wassenaar again entered the dry dock. On 16 July 1866 the fully loaded screw corvette Willem entered the old dock. A rumor that Adolf van Nassau would go to Vlissingen was then countered by saying that Adolf van Nassau first had to dock, and would then have to wait for some time on Willem, which was in that dry dock. In November 1866 the casemate ironclad De Ruyter was taken in.

== Dock characteristics ==
=== Dimensions ===
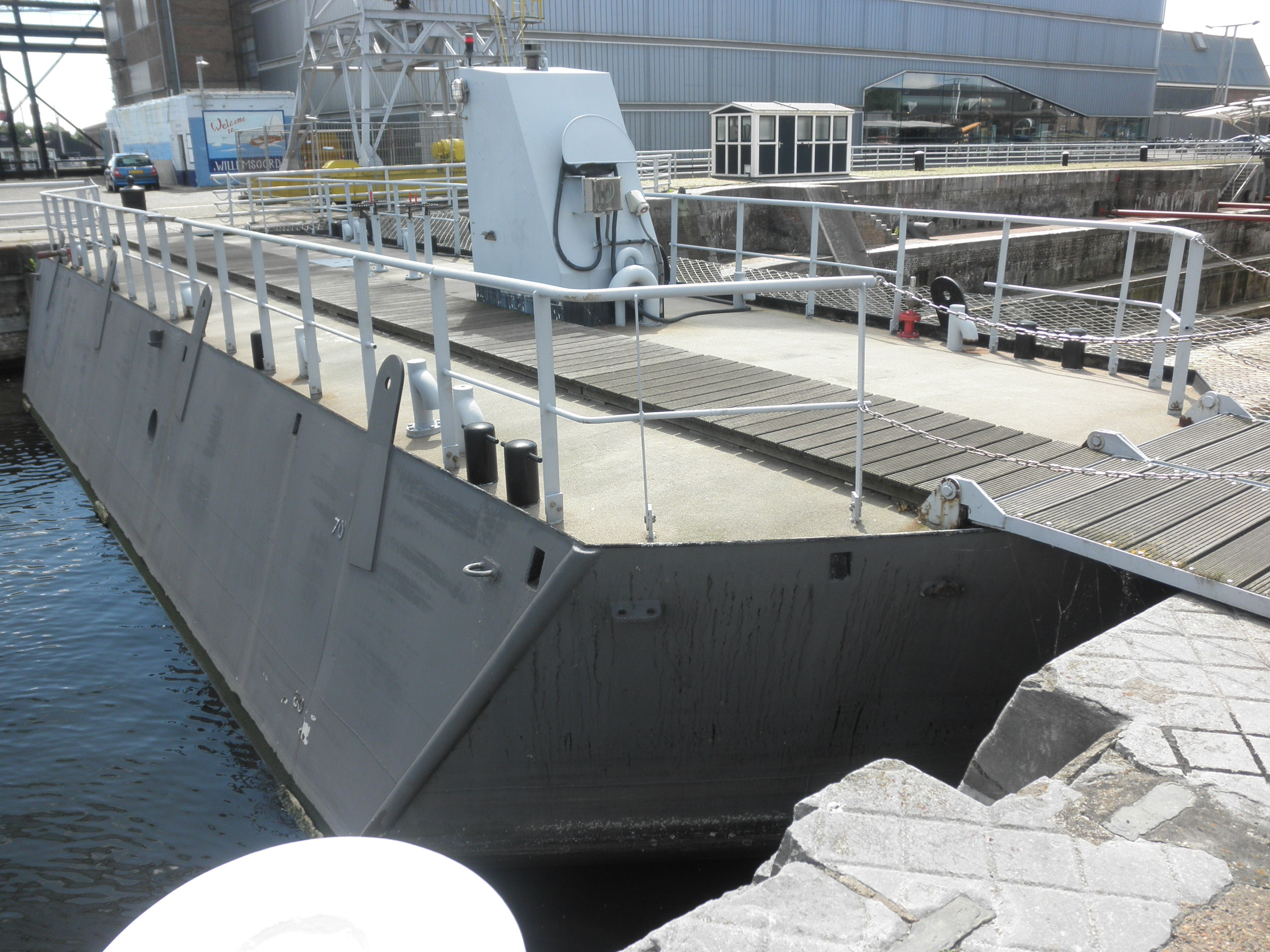
Floating door in Dry Dock I

The original dimensions were given by Jan Blanken in 1822. The depth below regular high tide was 7.22 m. Width in the center was 26.37 m. The length of the area where ships could be placed on the blocks (zetting) was 67.50 m. There was also a long slope of 46.15 m on the land side of the dock.

After the reconstruction the dock floor came to 6.2 m below high tide. The length of the area of the dock where blocks were placed came to 76.35 m. In the 1870s Tideman noted a length of 80.7 m, a high water width of 18 m, and an allowed draft for docking ships of 5.20 m on the blocks. As can be seen from the above this 5.2 m related to normal conditions.

Dry Dock I currently measures 85 by 25 meters on ground level and is about 4 meters deep. The width of the dock decreases incrementally till reaching the bottom of the dock.

=== The Ship Caisson ===
The current ship caisson is not the one installed during the 1850-1861 rebuild.

=== Pumphouse I (building 47) ===
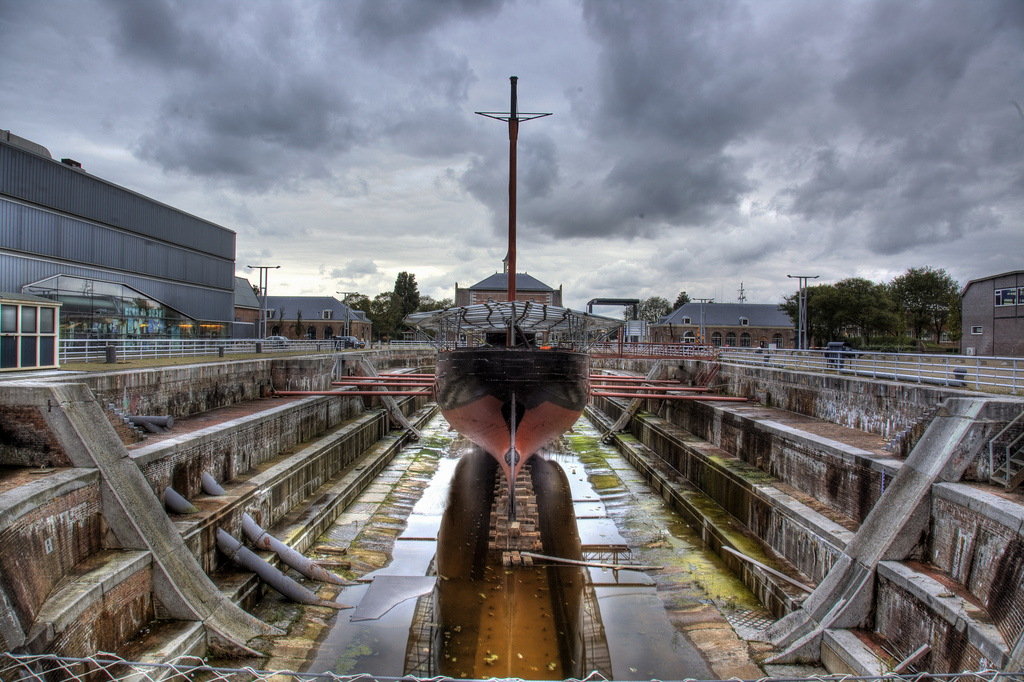
Bonaire in the drydock

Before and during world war II Pumphouse I was strengthened with reinforced concrete. In 1942 the roof was also replaced by one of reinforced concrete. In 2004 the building was restored. It housed the Tourist Office of Den Helder for some time, but this went broke in 2003. The first floor of Pumphouse I is the office of Willemsoord BV, a company that develops Willemsoord as a commercial and shopping center.

=== Current status ===
Willemsoord Dry Dock I is still functional, and is now part of the Maritime Attraction Park Willemsoord. Since 2005 the historic Samarang-class gunvessel (Schroefstoomschip 4e klasse) HNLMS Bonaire, launched in 1880, is being restored in the drydock. This is a restoration project that is as radical as that of HMS Warrior from 1860 in Southampton. It fits the ambition to turn Willemsoord into a Maritime attraction park and new city center for Den Helder.
