= Vlissingen Navy Drydock =

Dry dock in Vlissingen, Netherlands

- Dok van Perry (Dutch)
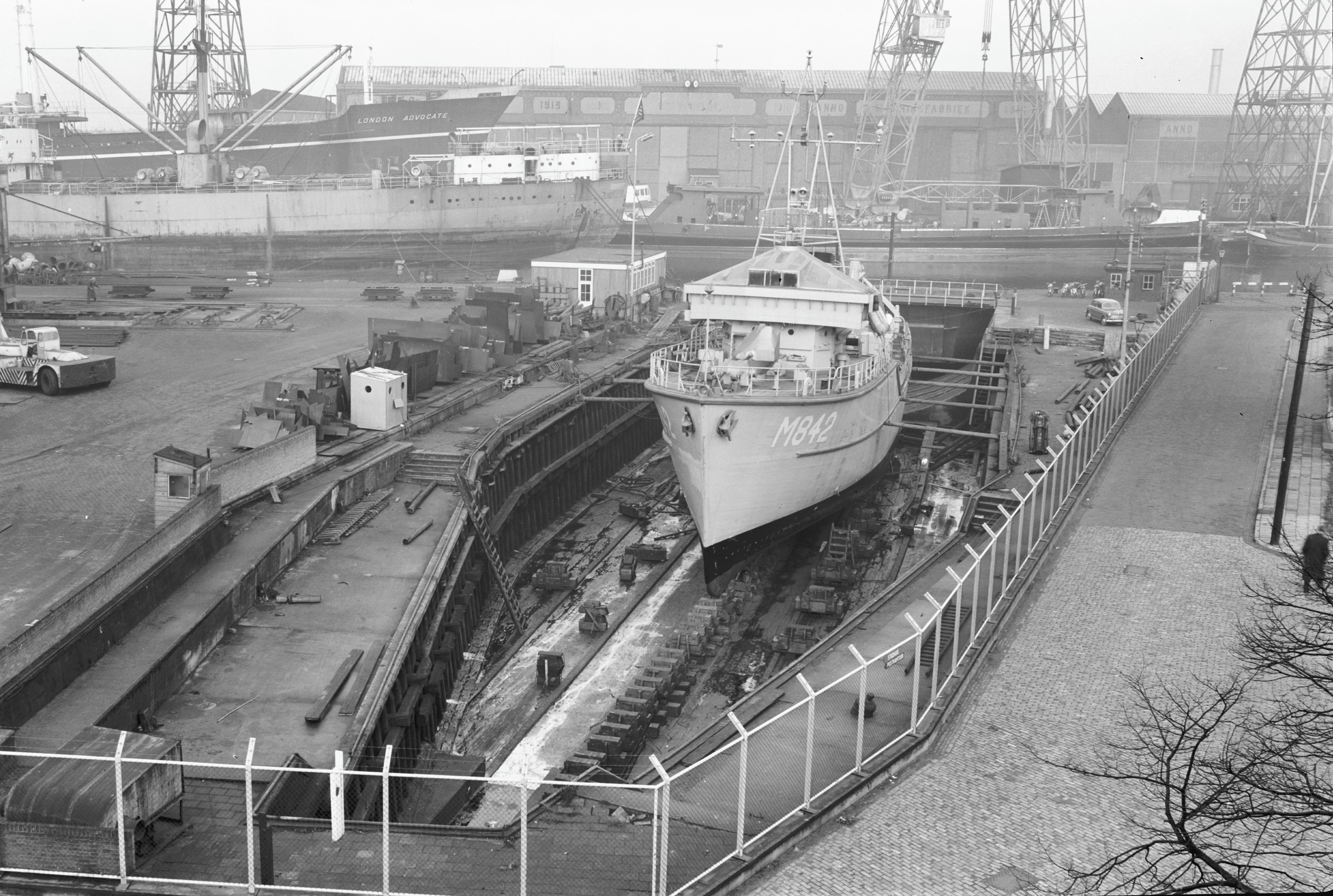
- Vlissingen Navy Drydock in 1964
- Interactive map of the Vlissingen Navy Drydock area

General information
- Location: Bij Dok van Perry 31, Vlissingen, Zeeland, Netherlands
- Coordinates: 51.444196°N 3.578489°E
- Construction started: 1704
- Completed: 1705
- Client: Zeeland Admiralty, Dutch Navy, De Schelde (former)

Design and construction
- Architect: John Perry

Vlissingen Navy Drydock is a dry dock in Vlissingen. It is the oldest dry dock of the Netherlands, and is now a tourist attraction known as Dok van Perry.

== Context ==
=== Docking in the 17th century ===
In the 17th century, being in ordinary was the normal condition of a warship. It meant that the warship was stripped of rigging and guns, and did not have a crew. A wet dock was the ideal location for a ship in ordinary, because it shelters a ship from the waves and tides. At the time, dry docks were a recent invention. They were found to be especially useful for inspecting and maintaining purpose built warships, the design of which had recently began to deviate from merchant sailing ships.

=== The wet dock ===
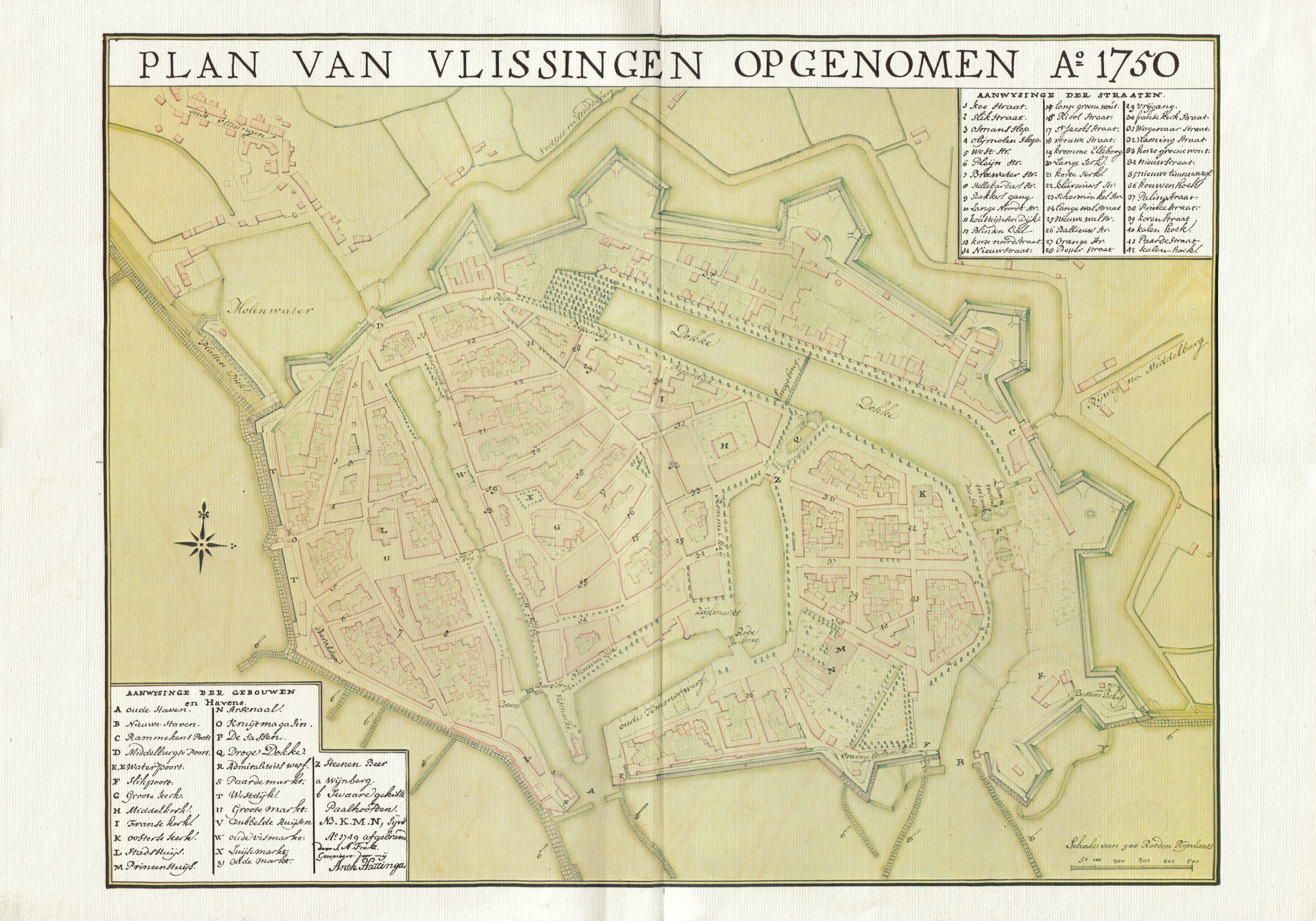
1750 map of Vlissingen

The Dutch navy was organized in 5 admiralties. Each required a suitable place to store its ships when they were in ordinary. The Admiralty of Zeeland already had a small wet dock and port since 1614. This did not suffice, because in winter many warships stood at the bottom when they were in port.

In 1687 Stadtholder William III sent a letter to the States General requesting approval for the Zeeland Admiralty to raise a loan to create a large wet dock. The reason given was that otherwise the warships of the admiralty would completely decay. The proposal was approved, and LA Cornelis Evertsen the Youngest and two engineers visited Vlissingen and Veere to determine where, and how the wet dock should be built.

The Vlissingen city government had some reservations. These centered on the removal of some private shipyards that had been founded around the existing dock, the commercial use of the wet dock, and the height of the city's contribution. After threats that the dock would otherwise be made in Veere, the city agreed in April 1688. The council soon after also gave permission to demolish the old Rammekenspoort, that was obviously in the way. The new and much larger wet dock was started in 1687 and finished in 1693.

== The Dry Dock ==
=== Location ===
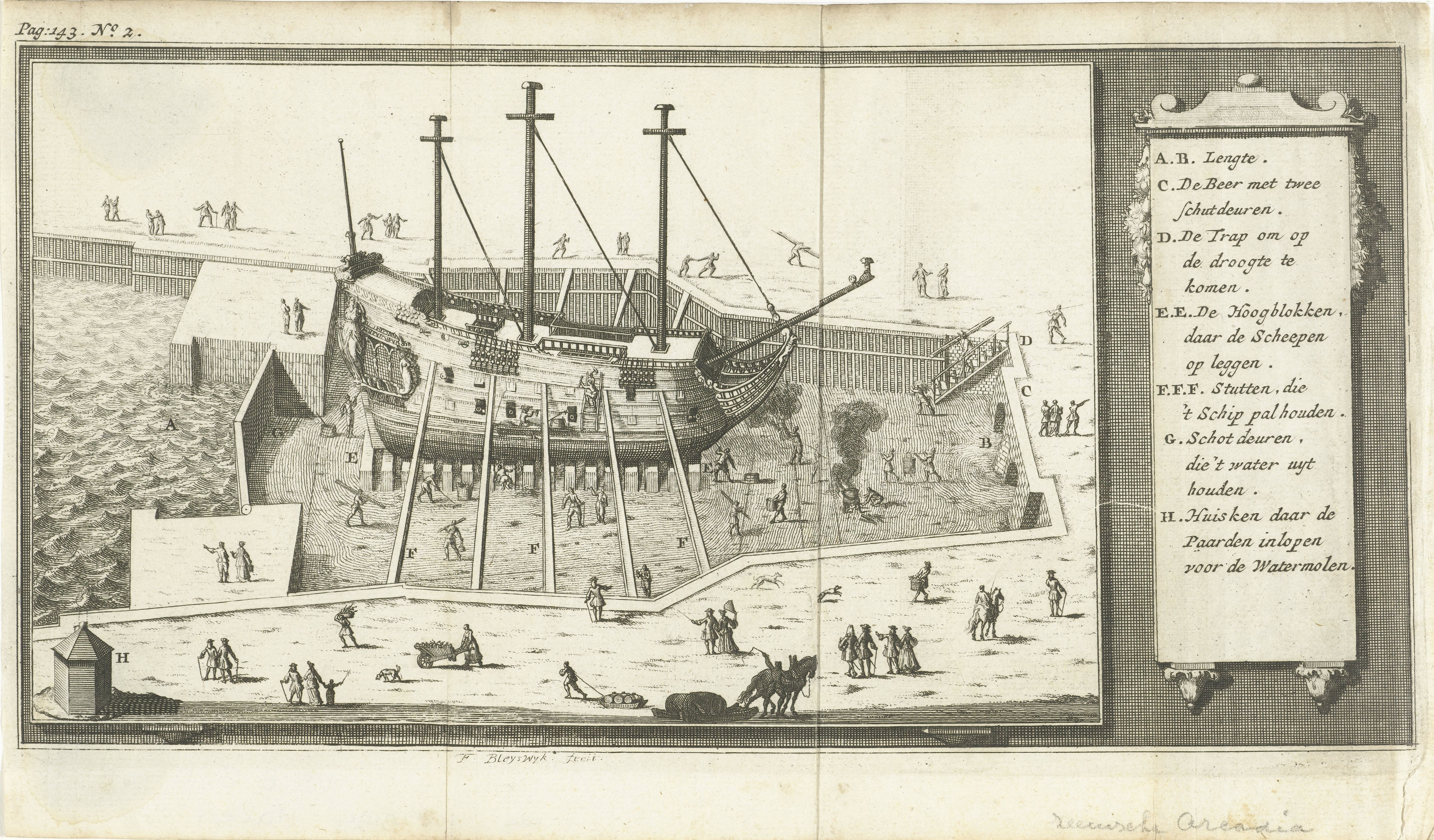
The dry dock 1717-1755 with explanation

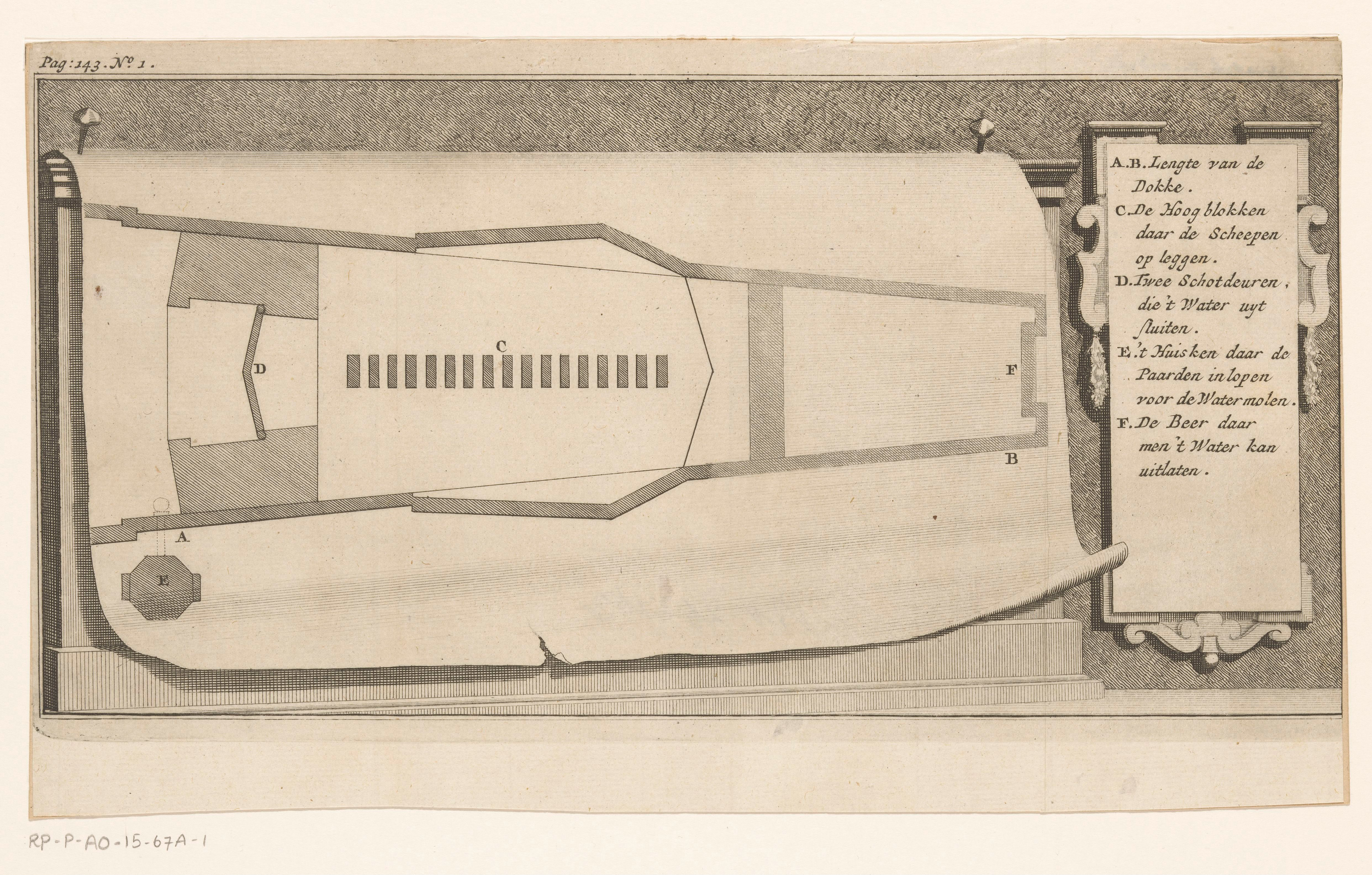
floor plan of the dry dock

When the first dock was completed in 1614, it was connected to a part of the city moat located where the dry dock now is. In turn the city moat was connected to the shallow harbor Pottekaai by means of a lock called Leeuwensluis, which was later replaced by a stone sluice. This sluice had two big sewers with gates, by which water could be led to clean and keep the Pottekaai up to depth. Of course, at high tide, water could also be allowed to flow in the other direction. In spite of becoming a sluice, the construction retained the name 'Leeuwensluis'. One can suppose that this Leeuwensluis and its successor had lock chamber that enabled them to discharge so much water at once, that it had a flush effect. The 1750 map shows two sewers.

This connection made the stretch of old city moat an ideal location for the present dry dock. The traditional way to empty a dry dock was to put a ship in at high tide, and then to get rid of most of the water by letting it flow out at low tide. Of course the latter could not be done on the dock side. However, the Pottekaai was a tidal harbor, and so a dry dock at this location would allow ships to enter from the wet dock side, while using the tide from the Pottekaai side.

=== Design and construction ===
The design of the dry dock was made by Captain John Perry in 1697. Perry (1670-1733) was an engineer later known for his book The State of Russia under the Present Czar (1716) and other works. In 1704 the decision to build the dry dock was taken, and a budget of 37,000 guilders was allocated. Construction started in 1704 and was finished in 1705.

=== Characteristics ===
The dry dock has a ship shaped form in order to lessen the amount of remaining water that had to be pumped out. This was quite relevant, because pumps were driven by a horse-mill. The maximum length of ships that could dock was 180 feet, enough for any Dutch warship. The closure was done by regular lock doors. Commercial ships could use the dock for 10 stuivers per feet for 8 days.

In the 1830s an investigation showed that the old foundation of the dock consisted of three heavy fir beams in the length of the dry dock, close to each other. On top of these and perpendicular were fir 'kespen'. In the center these were supported by oak beams in between.

== First Navy Service period (1705-1745) ==
=== Problematic service ===
After the dry dock was taken into use, it soon showed problems. The main problem was that engineers were not able to sufficiently keep the water from the wet dock out of the dry dock. The result was that there was always water on the floor of the dry dock. The solution for making a waterproof lock gate for a dry dock was the ship caisson or ship-door invented in France in 1683, but this solution was not applied.

In 1737 an amount of water suddenly welled up near the doors, and in 1738 the same happened on the other side. There were some repairs, but these were not completely effective. The naval shipworm also played its part, and from 1737 to 1745 the dry dock gradually fell into disrepair.

In 1744 the sea lock, which closed the wet dock became unusable, and then the dry dock fell in further disrepair, because it could hardly be used till the sea lock had been repaired in 1753. A memorial stone has 1745 as year that the dry dock closed down.

== Out of service (1746-1834) ==
=== Possibility of repair ===
In 1762 orders were given to repair the dry dock's doors, and to clean the dock. In 1763 the whole, but especially the sluice 'Steenen Beer' or Leeuwensluis, was in such a bad condition, that the Pottekaai harbor could no longer be kept up to depth by draining through the lock. Multiple options were then considered. First was a complete renovation of the dry dock for 30,000 guilders. Second, abandoning it by constructing a dam., The third option was to do some maintenance and to repair the sluice. This last option, costing 9,570 guilders was chosen.

In 1766 Stadtholder William V, Prince of Orange proposed to repair the dry dock for 13,656 guilders, but this was not executed. By 1774 the walls of the dry dock were in complete disrepair. That year, and again in 1777, plans for action came to nothing.

=== 1783 report ===
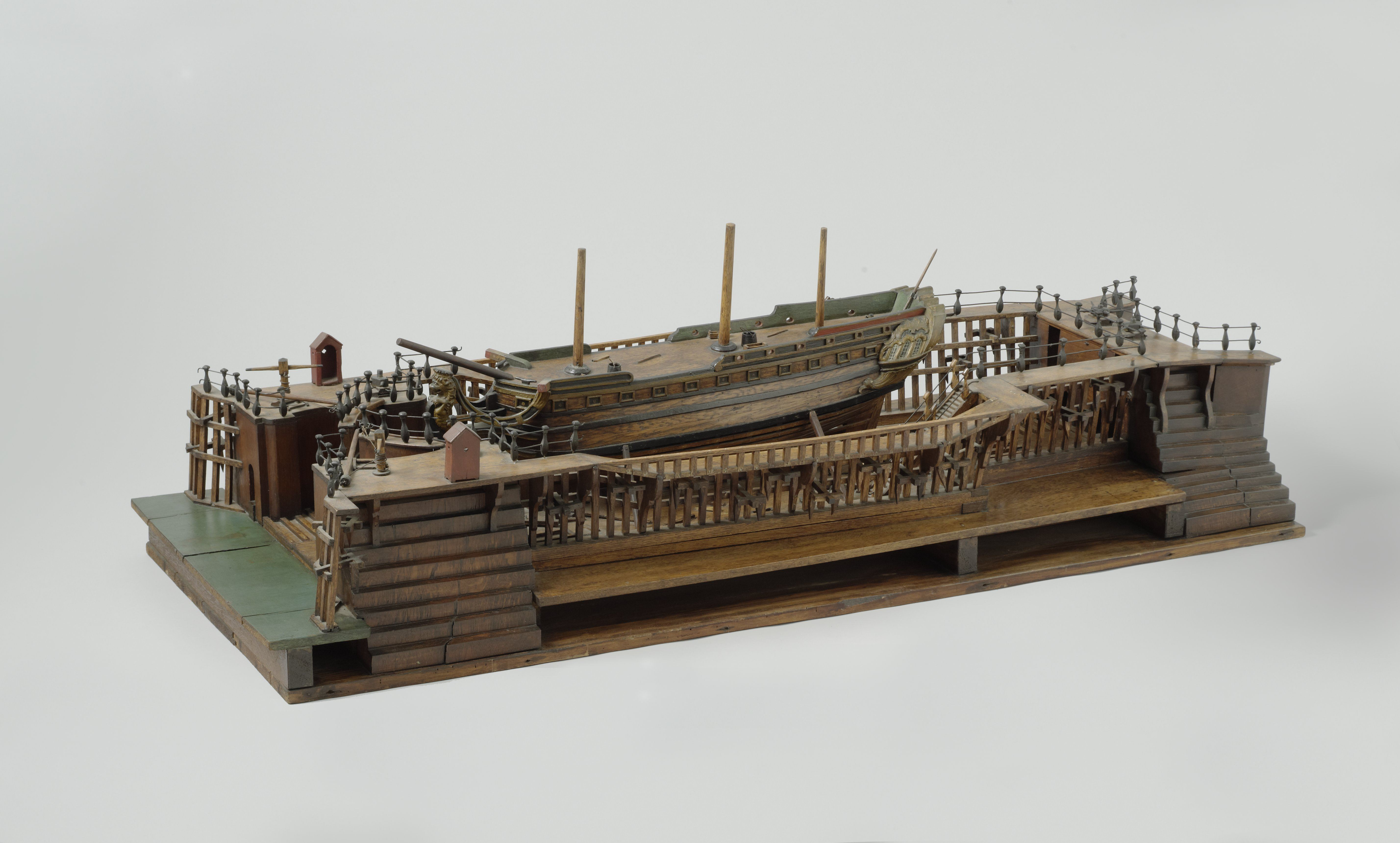
Model of Vlissingen dry dock in 1783

In May 1783 a commission issued a report about Vlissingen naval base. With regard to the dry dock it said that it was too far away from the workplaces, warehouses, and exit of the harbor. Also ships had become bigger, and so it could not be used for ships of the line of 60 and 70 guns. However, restoring the wet dock was more important. After that, it would be time to look at the dry dock.

=== 1795 report ===
After the Batavian Republic was founded, another commission made more specific remarks about the dry dock. Vlissingen was the most suitable place for a dry dock, because of the high tidal range. A dry dock would preserve many ships, and lead to better and cheaper repairs.

=== The French Time ===
During the French period there were again plans to fix the dry dock. A plan showed a sluice which had been moved 9 m outward, and two new buildings, probably for a steam engine and equipment. It would have resulted in a 78 m long dry dock, probably 17.5 m wide.

== Rebuild (1834-1838) ==
=== Investigation and new design ===
After the French left, nothing much was done at first. Meanwhile, the condition of the Leeuwensluis (Steenen Beer) became so serious that it might break, and flood both dry and wet dock. It led to the construction of a dam on the wet dock side of the sluice. In 1834 works in the wet dock made that the water level in the dry dock became so low, that Engineer A.E. Tromp performed an investigation of the dry dock.

Tromp next made a design for a rebuild with use of a ship caisson and steam power. It would also lead to the dock becoming longer, so that the new larger ships of the line could use the dock. A less obvious change was that Tromp created a shallow step near the top by making the top of the inner sides lower than the street level. Approval for rebuilding the dry dock so it could service ships of the line of 84 guns came in on 31 December 1835.

=== Construction ===
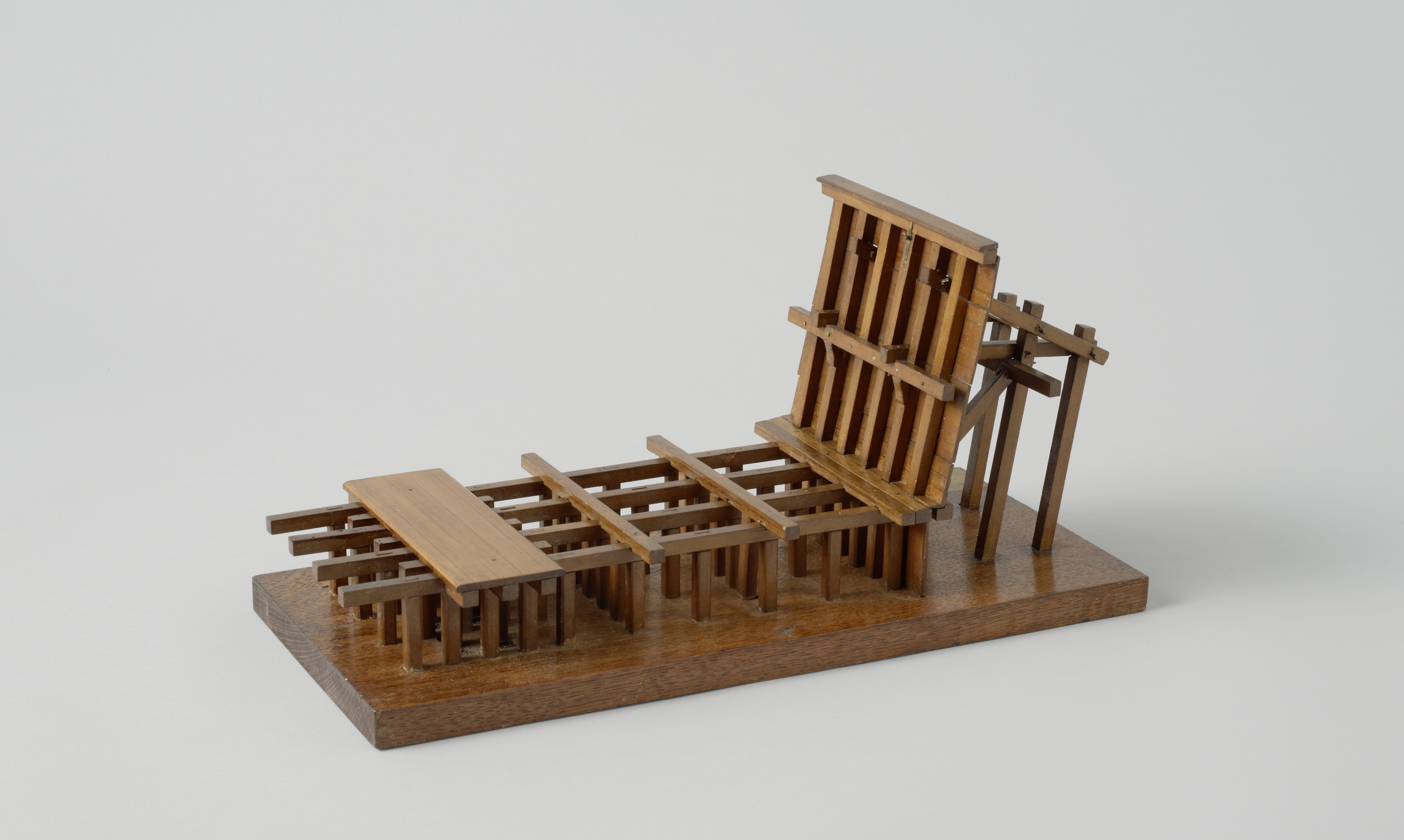
Vlissingen Navy Drydock, model after the repairs of 1837 had been made.

The rebuild of the dry dock would take place in three phases. The first phase was tendered on 26 March 1836. It started with the construction of two dams on the outside of the dry dock. Next everything was excavated. A foundation was made for the walls that would hold the ship caisson, and the foundation of the dry dock itself was repaired and reinforced. The camp shedding got new woodwork. This cost 43,000 guilders, and was done by D. Dronkers from Middelburg. The navy supplied the materials. By June 1836 the dams were under construction in the wet dock and in the Pottekaai, which would close of the dry dock. On 29 November 1836 a hurricane hit Vlissingen. It toppled the heavy piledriving machinery, seriously hurting two workers.

The second phase would start in 1837, but was already tendered on 1 September 1836. These orders included the brickwork of the ship lock, the drainage sewer, and the pit for placing the steam engines. This time the tender included most materials. The order was won by J.J. van Uije for 47,000 guilders. By March 1837 pile-driving, the earth works and shoring were ready. Brickwork and work to replace the Leeuwensluis was about to start. By June 1837 brick work had advanced significantly. On 2 July 1837 the king visited Vlissingen and the dry dock. By August the second phase was almost finished. On 18 August 1837 Prince Frederick visited the dry dock, and the ship caisson which was under construction at the shipyard. By November 1837 the dry dock was practically finished, with work on the steam engine still underway.

The third phase consisted of the works on the Leeuwensluis. The last part of the works was delayed by a very severe winter. On 10 March 1838 there was a tender for making the upper camp shedding, a fence to close the terrain and for the removal of the dams. On 30 May 1838 the ship caisson was placed, and the steam engine was almost ready. The total cost of the rebuild came to 176,005.80 guilders.

=== The new dry dock ===
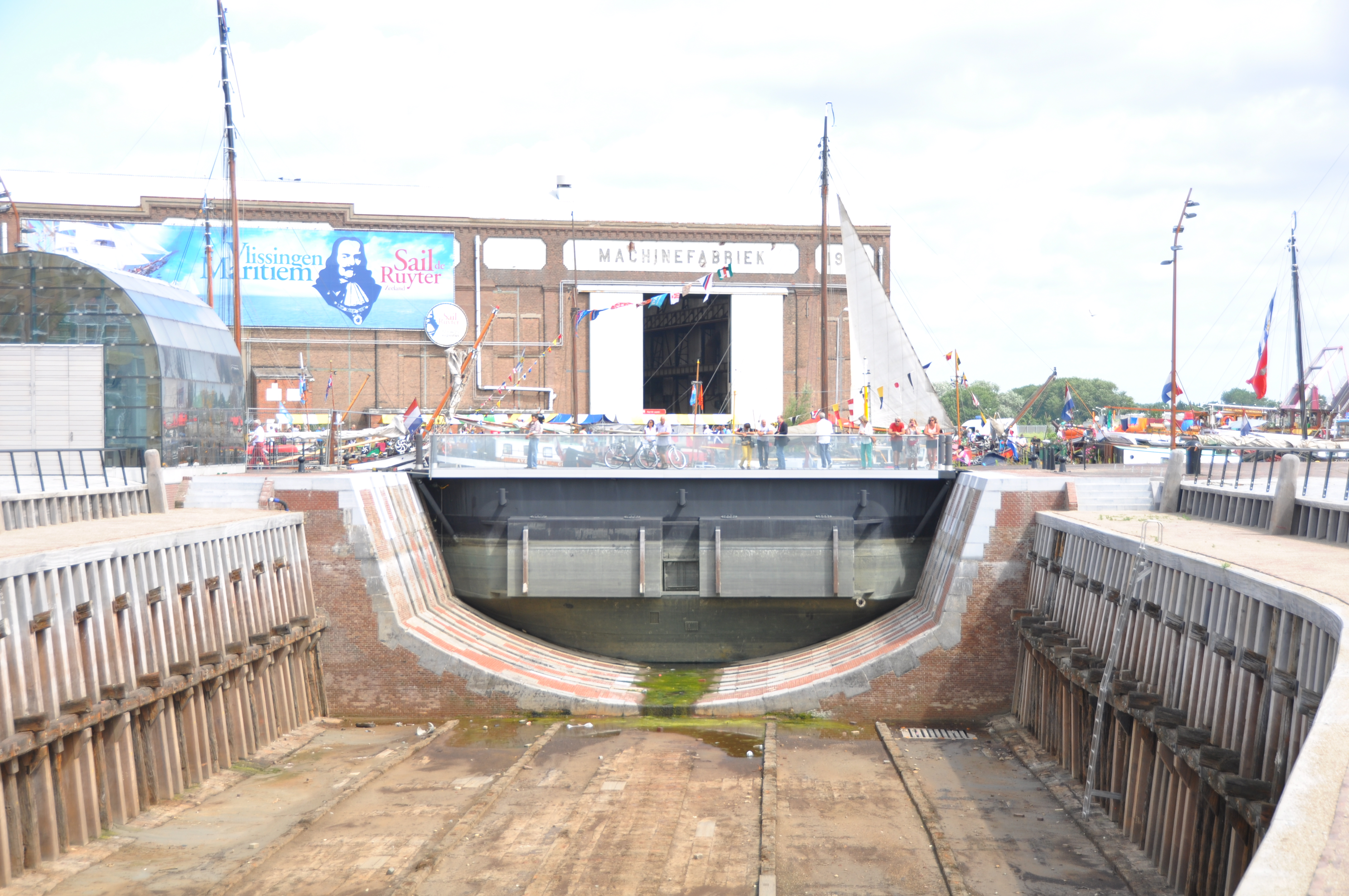
the caisson lock

The caisson lock is a construction that holds a ship caisson. For this purpose its sides and floor have four rabbets. Each rabbet was 60 cm wide and 21 cm deep, and made from stones which had been carefully set and attached. An old model ship caisson then had two edges that fit these rabbets, allowing to vary the size of the part of the dock which had to be pumped dry. On the outside of the ship two memorial inscription were placed.

The caisson lock was 14.50 m long. At street level it was 17.50 m wide. The center of the inverted arc was 1.29 m below ebb. On the sides of the arc, this was 0.96 m. The radius of the arc was 13.445 m. The flat sides above the arc fell back at a slope of 18 degrees, and came to 4.98 m above ebb.

The discharge sewer and pit for the engines was dug simultaneously with the caisson lock. The pumphouse was built above the pit, and housed a regular low-pressure Watt steam engine of 18 hp. It powered a double suction pump of 60 cm diameter. With 13 strokes a minute, and 0.283 m^{3} a stroke, it emptied the dry dock in 6 hours, if water had first been let out via the Leeuwensluis.

The Leeuwensluis or Steenen Beer had to be repaired by the state if would be demolished in order to extend the dock. This was done when it was replaced by a dam with a brick closable culvert. The culvert was 11 m long, 1 m wide and 1.5 m high in the center of its arc. Its walls were 1 m thick. On both sides the sewer had gates. On top the dam was 10.80 m wide. The municipality was compensated with 14,000 guiders for the loss of the ability to keep the Pottekaai harbor up to depth by means of the Leeuwensluis. The stretch of floor of the Leeuwensluis which became available for the dry dock was then reinforced with a foundation, so it could serve as an extension of the dry dock.

=== New dimensions ===
After the rebuild, the dimensions of the dock had changed. From the inward facing side of the ship caisson to the 'bow' (front) of the dry dock proper, the floor was now 60 m long. The Leeuwesluis was replaced by a dam, and the extra floor that was thus created, was 9 m long, making for a total length of 69 m. At floor level, the biggest width was 18.7 m, which applied to a section from the ship door almost to the center of the dry dock. Near the 'bow' of the dry dock proper, the width at floor level was only 9.2 m. The biggest width at street level was 20.2 m. After extra flooring had been added, the floor was 1,60 m below ebb near the ship door, and 0.92 m below ebb near the old bow of the dock. Twenty extra beams of 36 cm square were later added perpendicular to the length of the dry dock. These were interconnected wedged in the floor. However, near the ship caisson, they could be removed in order to dock a ship of the line.

Because of the enlargement the restored dry dock could welcome almost any Dutch warship. The Adolf van Nassau with a length of 72.86 m p.p., launched in 1861, was probably the first Dutch warship that did not fit in the Vlissingen dry dock.

== Second Navy Service period (1838-1875) ==
=== The first ships get docked in the repaired dry dock (1838-1847) ===
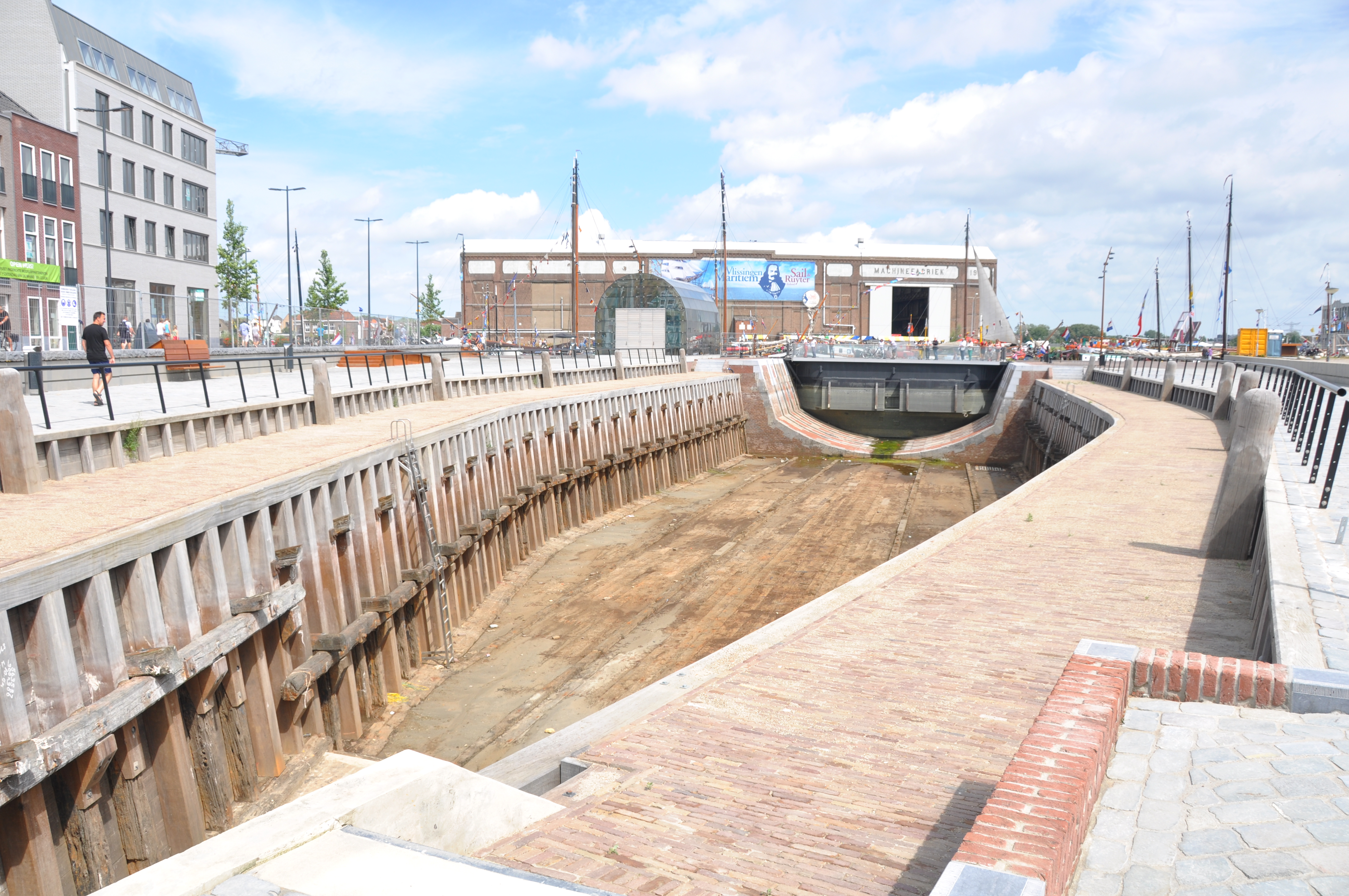
After renovation

On 17 July 1838 the corvette HNLMS Ajax was the first ship to use the repaired dry dock. On 16 January 1839 the frigate HNLMS Diana was in the dry dock when she caught fire and most of the ex-English ship was lost. In early 1844 the frigate HNLMS Rijn was in the dry dock. In April 1844 the steam vessel Stad Vlissingen was taken in. On 9 May 1845 the schooner HNLMS Adder was launched and immediately brought into the dry dock. In 1847 the sea lock of the wet dock was dammed off for repairs. It meant that ships could no longer reach the dry dock. On 27 November 1848 repairs on the Sea Lock had progressed so far that the steam vessel Cerberus could enter the wet dock.

=== Service as most important dry dock of the Netherlands (1848-1861) ===
By Summer 1849 works on the Sea Lock were finished, and Vlissingen Navy was usable again. That same year Willemsoord Dry Dock I in Willemsoord, Den Helder became unusable till October 1861. It left the Dutch Navy with only Hellevoetsluis Dry Dock and the dry dock in Vlissingen. Vlissingen Navy dry dock suddenly became very important, because it was the deepest of the two. In October 1850 4 smiths and 15 carpenters were moved from Willemsoord to Vlissingen.

In the April 1856 debate about a new dry dock for Willemsoord, the position of Vlissingen Navy Dock was again made clear. The new dock in Willemsoord was necessary for the heaviest ships of the 1855 system, i.e. the frigates of 400 hp. These frigates could not enter Hellevoetsluis harbor, even when completely empty. The lighter frigate of 44 guns old model had to be emptied and cleared of rigging and topmasts, in order to enter the harbor of Vlissingen (probably meaning Hellevoetsluis) at spring tide. For Vlissingen Drydock the 60 guns frigates then in use (i.e. Doggersbank) were the maximum that could be handled. It was used for these sailing frigates only with much cost and lost time. Heavier ships, with machinery, boilers and screw axle on board would not be able to use Vlissingen Drydock. (The first Dutch frigate with steam power, HNLMS Wassenaar, was launched in September 1856, and was a lengthened 60-gun frigate.)

The heaviest Dutch frigates were indeed serviced by Vlissingen Navy Drydock during this period. In July 1851 HNMS Prins Frederik (36) (ex-Ceres, draft 5.74 m) was placed in the dry dock. In August 1853 the heavy frigate Doggersbank (52) (draft 6.30 m) was brought into the dry dock. On 30 December 1853 the frigate Palembang (30) was about to be docked. In October 1854 HNLMS Sambre (36) was docked. In August 1855 HNLMS Prins van Oranje (60) of 2,485t displacement and 6.30 m draft was put in the dry dock. She had been in ordinary for two years. In September 1856 the frigate HNLMS Prins Alexander (22) was docked. In April 1858 the heavy frigate De Ruyter was about to be docked.

Of the still omnipresent paddle steamers, the paddle steamer HNLMS Gedeh (draft 4.80 m) of the Ardjoeno class went to dock in Vlissingen in May 1852. In March 1854 the paddle steamer HNLMS Amsterdam, of the same class was serviced. In late September 1856 the steam vessel HNLMS Merapi was docked. On 8 July 1859 Sindoro was docked.

Smaller vessels were also docked. In March 1851 corvette HNLMS Sumatra (draft 5.40 m) was docked. In March 1857 schooner HNLMS Atalante was serviced. In January 1858 the corvette Pallas, and brig HNLMS Courier were serviced.

There was also a number of commercial and foreign vessels serviced. From 14 to 16 September 1852 the Prussian sailing frigate SMS Gefion was docked and coppered. In January 1854 the English brig Ithiel was partly coppered in the dry dock. In March 1856 the Oldenburg steamer Budjadingen was serviced. On 31 December 1856 the ocean liner La Belgique of 84 m was brought into the dry dock, the mysterious message was that the ship caisson had to remain outside. Perhaps meaning that the ship caisson was pressed to the outside of the dry dock, like this was later possible in Willemsoord. La Belgique left Vlissingen on 12 January 1857. On 4 March 1858 the leaky steamer Gouverneur van Ewijk was tugged to Vlissingen, and was brought into the dry dock.

The length of La Belgique showed that propeller driven ships were generally longer than their sail only counterparts. In June 1855 the new screw corvette Medusa was docked. Medusa of 1,241t was 51.5 m long, i.e. almost as long as the sailing frigate Doggersbank of twice her size and 54 m long. In July 1856 the sister ship, screw corvette Amelia was 'doubled' in the dry dock. Amelia again visited the dock in December 1856, just before leaving for the East Indies. Such repeated dockings were recommended for screw ships, but would put a high strain on Dutch dry dock capacity. In May 1857 the screw frigate Wassenaar arrived for fitting out. She would be put into the dock to receive the last parts of her coppering. Note that she was far from finished at the time.

On 2 July 1857 HNLMS Groningen, the first purpose-designed screw corvette of the Dutch navy visited the dry dock. She was to be coppered, and to have her distillation machine placed. On 30 May 1858 the already commissioned sister ship Citadel van Antwerpen arrived to use the dock.

In the late 1850s Vlissingen Navy Drydock played a significant role in constructing floating batteries for the Dutch navy. In October 1858 the ship of the line Koning der Nederlanden (84) was brought in the dock to be converted into the floating battery Neptunus. In April 1859 Neptunus was brought out. In September 1859 the frigate HNLMS Prins Hendrik was in the dry dock to be rebuilt as floating battery. However, she was declared unfit and then taken out to be sold for break up. On 18 September 1859 the frigate HNLMS Ceres was then brought in to be converted to a floating battery. Ceres, or rather the upper part of her hull, would become Draak. She left the dry dock on 8 March 1860, while the lower part, or wreck was removed on 9 March.

=== One of the Dutch Dry Docks (1861-1868) ===
When Willemsoord Dry Dock I reopened on 26 October 1861, Vlissingen Navy Drydock became less crucial. The Dutch Navy then had a dry dock in Willemsoord which could service all ships. Willemsoord was expected to soon see the opening of the even larger Willemsoord Dry Dock II, but that would happen only on 28 May 1866. Meanwhile, in early October 1861 the Secretary for the Navy stated that Vlissingen Naval Base could be closed down in a few years.

It's probably that the completed rebuilt of Willemsoord Dry Dock I opened the opportunity for repairs at Vlissingen Navy Drydock. In May 1862 there was a tender for removing a small building, making a foundation with piles, and making a new small building and stack on top of this. The building would cover a steam engine and boiler at the dry dock. It was won by M.J. Ketting for 3,520 guilders. In mid August the steam engine was broken. On 23 September 1862 the corvette Prins Maurits was the first ship to enter the repaired dry dock, which was then emptied by the steam engine in the new building.

While the end seemed near for Vlissingen Naval Base, disaster struck again struck the nearly complete Willemsoord Dry Dock II in September 1862. It was clear that Vlissingen needed to be kept operational for some time. On 7 October 1862 the HNLMS De Ruyter was brought into the dry dock in order to be converted to a casemate ironclad. In November 1862 there was some commotion, because people in Vlissingen said that the steam frigate Zeeland, which was sent to dock in Toulon, could have used Vlissingen Navy Drydock, The secretary for the navy replied that this would have been costly, and would have endangered the dry dock. The commotion was amplified, because Zeeland had been in Vlissingen Navy Drydock earlier.

On 12 September 1863 the sailing corvette Pallas entered the dry dock. By then the armoring facilities in Vlissingen were being expanded. On 28 September 1863 the fully loaded corvette Prins Maurits entered the dry dock. On the 29th she left again, and the same day De Ruyter was again brought in, now ready to be armored.

On 5 May 1864 the North American warship USS Kearsarge (1861) Captain Winslow came before Vlissingen after hitting the ground near Oostende. She was brought into the dry dock, which she left on 10 May. While she was in the dry dock she was visited by hundreds.

On 31 August 1864 the new Djambi-class corvette Curaçao entered the dry dock to be coppered. On 21 November 1864 Citadel van Antwerpen entered the dry dock for repairs, which she left on 5 December. On 26 January 1865 the Barque Louis Meijer was docked. By March 1864, De Ruyter had been armored. On 8 March the Barque Burgemeester van Middelburg entered. In August 1865 the frigate Prins van Oranje entered the dry dock. In October 1865 Vice Admiraal Koopman was serviced, as was the screw corvette Leeuwarden, and again Curaçao, and again Prins Maurits.

1866 was the year that Willemsoord Dry Dock II was finally opened on 28 May. For Vlissingen Navy Drydock the year started as a continuation of the previous, with Vice Admiraal Koopman docking for a few weeks in January. After docking the steel gunboat Nimrod, and the brig HNLMS Wesp, Leeuwarden was serviced again in July. In September 1866, the budget for 1867 had the plan to move the armoring facilities to Amsterdam, and to subsequently stop building warships in Vlissingen.

Starting in 1867, the dry dock seems to have become quiet. In January 1867 the steamer Stad Vlissingen No 1. was docked. On 22 February 1867 the corvette Curaçao was brought into the dry dock. In late June 1867 machines of the armoring facilities were actually moved to Amsterdam. On 4 July 1868 the rebuilt Citadel van Antwerpen was launched for the second time. She was subsequently brought into the dry dock. Citadel's departure in August 1868 led to the final closing of Vlissingen Naval Base.

=== A dry dock for civilian use (1868-1875) ===
Nevertheless, on 17 November 1868 the Barque Noordster was docked. The message was that although the base was indeed becoming evacuated, the Navy Department intended to keep the dry dock in working condition. In December 1868 the English Eledona went into the dry dock. In March 1869 the steamer Zeeland entered the dry dock. On 10 April 1869 the Bargue Stad Middelburg was docked. In late December 1869 the ship Jonge Jan came to use the dry dock. In December 1871 the frigate Utrecht was refused, because it was too large. In August 1874 the ship Baron van Pallandt van Rosendaal arrived to use the dry dock. On 1 February 1875 the leaky Belgian ship Victorine Hortence Captain Defraye entered the dry dock. On 26 March 1875 the ship Philips van Marnix entered the dry dock. At the time the dry dock was probably owned by the Zeeland province, because the maintenance of the dry dock was tendered in June 1875.

== Service period as part of De Schelde Shipyard (1875-1974) ==
=== De Schelde's dry dock ===
In September 1875 Koninklijke Maatschappij De Schelde NV (KMS) was founded by taking over the former navy shipyard in Vlissingen, including the dry dock. By that time the dry dock was getting too small for ocean going vessels. On 30 June 1876 a competing dry dock was opened in nearby Middelburg. It was named Prins Hendrik, and was 115 m long, and on average 21 m wide.

There was still some activity at the dry dock, but it diminished. In May 1876 the steamer Stad Breda was cleaned. On 3 July 1878 the ship A.H. van Tienhoven Sr. entered the dry dock. At the time the dry dock faced competition from the dry dock in Middelburg. In 1886 it became somewhat busier than previously by cleaning some Belgian vessels. In 1889 only 15 ships used the dry dock.

=== One of the De Schelde dry docks ===
In early 1890 there were plans to lengthen Vlissingen Navy Drydock, and to build a new dry dock in the old navy lock. However, in August 1893 De Schelde bought the competing Prins Hendrik Drydock and Middelburgs Welvaren Shipyard, both in Middelburg. For the moment 'De Schelde' then had enough capacity. It used the Middelburg dry dock for many of its bigger jobs. In March 1895 the 86.2 m long armored cruiser Evertsen, built by De Schelde, was put in that dry dock.

The Vlissingen dry dock lingered on. In 1895 13 steam and 8 sailing vessels used the Vlissingen dry dock. In 1896 9 steam and 14 sailing vessels used the Vlissingen dry dock. In 1897 15 steam and 15 sailing vessels used the Vlissingen dry dock. In 1901 it was used by only 23 ships, and brought a loss, because of repairs to the machinery.

=== Dry dock for submarines ===
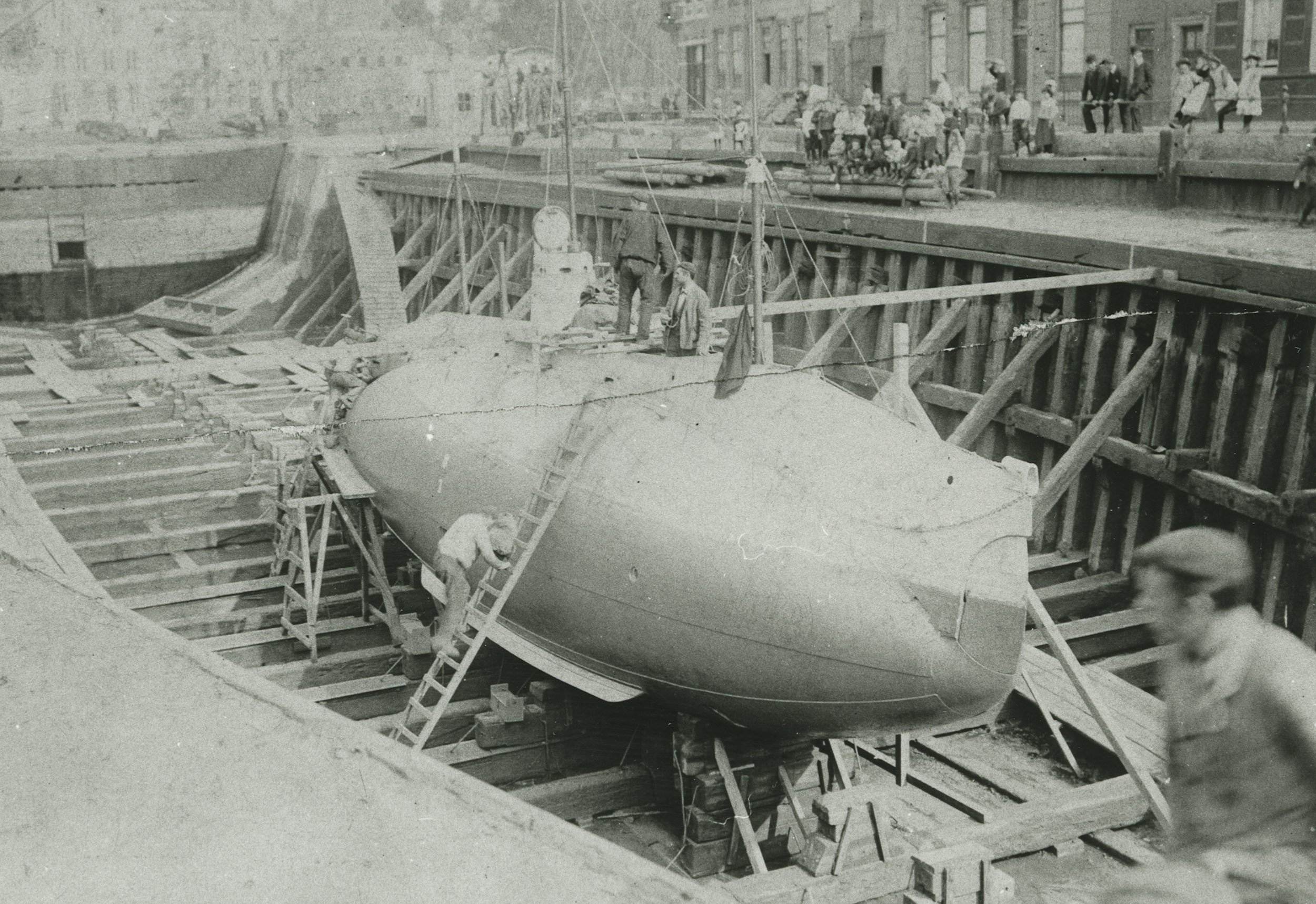
O1 in the dry dock c. 1905.

In 1904 De Schelde laid down the submarine 'Luctor et Emergo', later known as HNLMS O 1. It was the first of a few dozen submarines built by De Schelde. It meant work for the old dry dock, as many of these early submarines did fit in the dry dock. In March 1906 she was repaired in the dry dock. In 1906 exploitation of Vlissingen dry dock was profitable. In April 1909 there was another statement that the dry dock could service only smaller ships, and that a bigger dry dock was desirable for the shipyard and city. In April 1911, the submarine HNLMS O 2 was in the dry dock, in which a shed was made to cover the submarine for the time being.

In April 1936 De Schelde bought some land at the Steenen Beer in order to expand the dry dock. This was necessary because of the construction of the 84 m long Polish submarine Orzeł, laid down on 14 August 1936. This submarine was launched from the slipway in January 1938. So, the expansion was not necessary to build the submarine, but might have been thought of as a means to do maintenance on newer submarines.

=== De Schelde builds a new large dry dock ===
In January 1938 De Schelde ordered a new dry dock of reinforced concrete 'on the island' (Op het Eiland). On 2 November 1939 De Schelde opened the concrete new dry dock in Vlissingen. It was 144.5 m long. Vlissingen Navy Drydock now got called 'The small drydock' (Het Kleine Droogdok).

=== The dry dock is filled up (1974) ===
On 7 March 1967 Vlissingen Navy Drydock became a national monument. Despite being a listed monument, Vlissingen Navy Drydock was filled up in 1974.

== Current Situation as Dok van Perry ==
In 2010 restoration of Vlissingen Navy Drydock began by digging it out. In 2013 the renovated dock was reopened by Pieter van Vollenhoven. In August 2013 the Tres Hombres was the first ship to use the reopened dry dock. The plan is to make the dry dock the permanent home of the museum ship minesweeper Mercuur in 2023.

The restored dry dock is currently called Dok van Perry in Dutch. The name surfaced in the media somewhere in the early 2000s, and goes back at least to 2005.
