= Caisson (lock gate) =

Form of lock gate consisting of a large floating iron or steel box

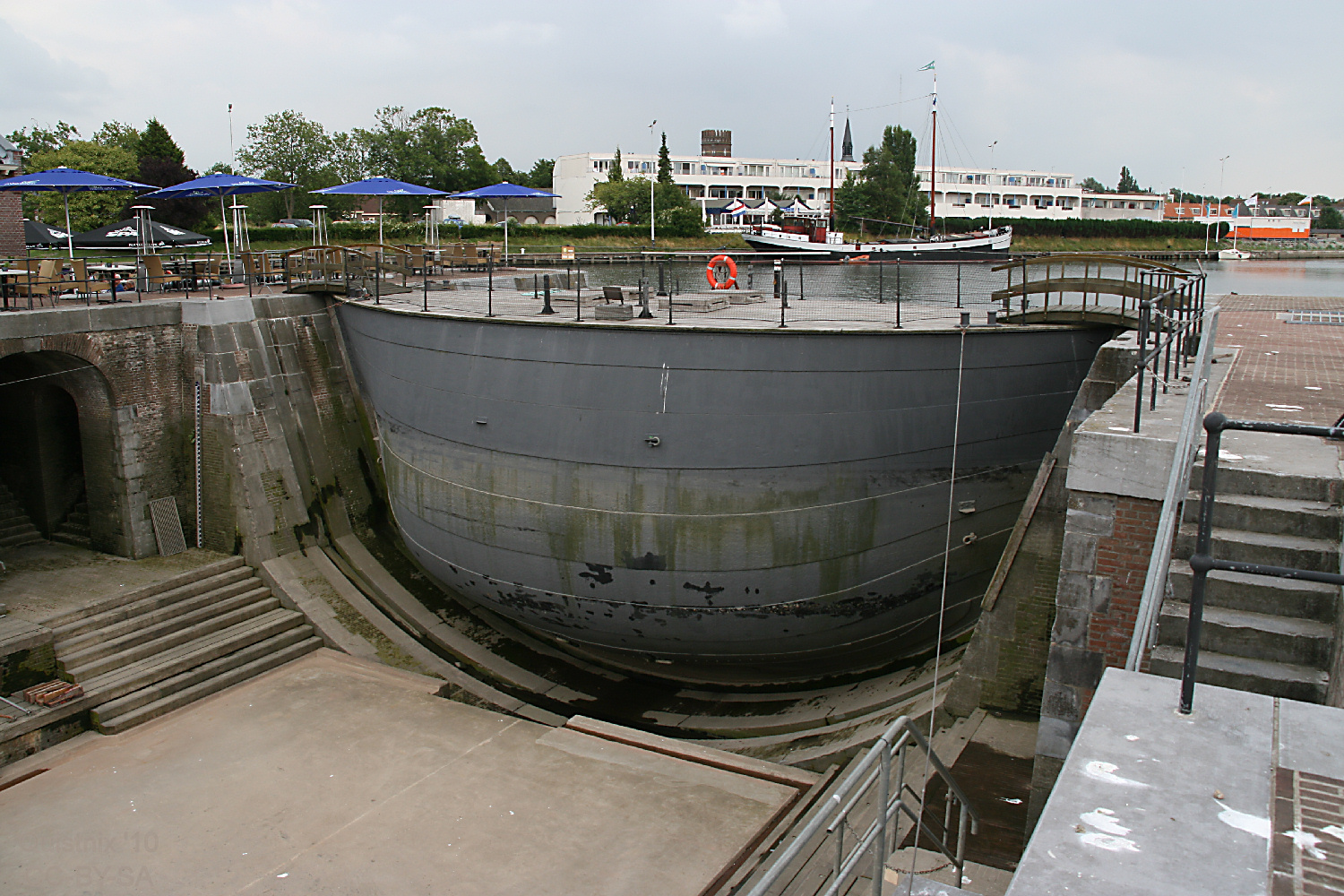
Ship caisson at Droogdok Jan Blanken at Hellevoetsluis

A caisson is a form of lock gate. It consists of a large floating iron or steel box. This can be flooded to seat the caisson in the opening of the dock to close it, or pumped dry to float it and allow it to be towed clear of the dock.

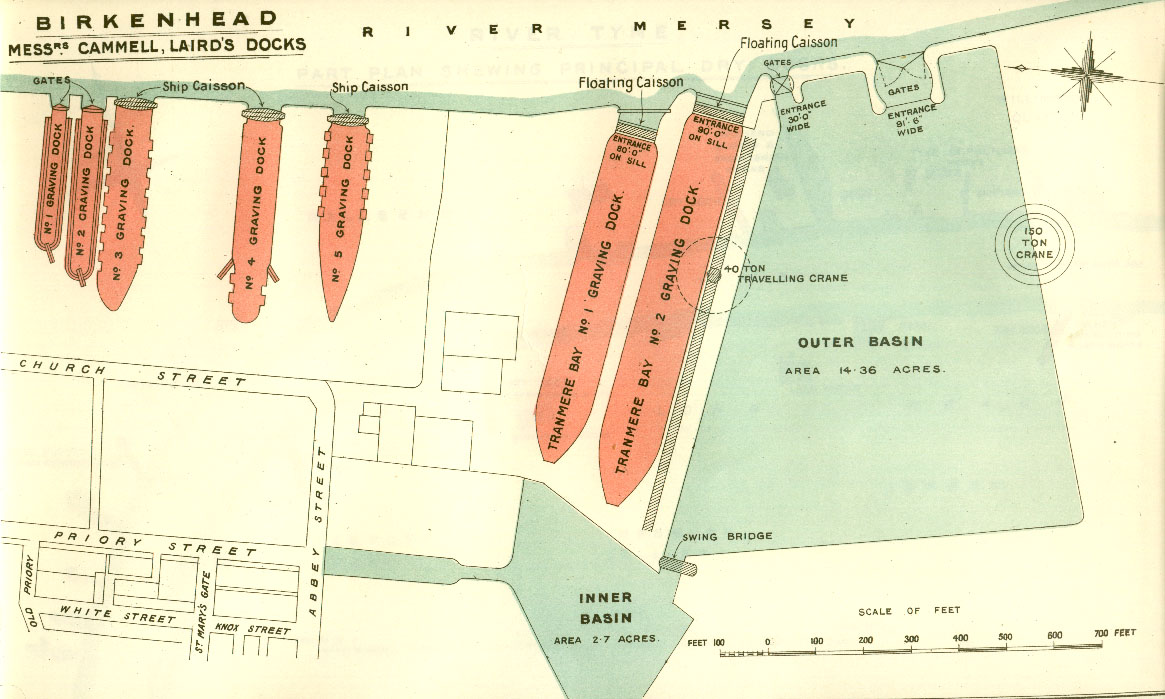
Graving docks at Birkenhead, closed by a variety of ship caissons and floating (sliding) caissons

== Chevron gates ==
Most locks are closed by chevron or mitre gates rather than by caissons. These are pairs of hinged gates that form a "V" shape, with the deeper water outside the V. Water pressure thus holds them closed. These gates can be opened and closed quickly, so they are used for canal locks, to change levels, and also for most freight docks. As the function of a freight dock is to enclose deep water, such gates point inwards. A graving or dry dock, in contrast, excludes water, and so their gates point outwards.

Hinged gates are relatively complicated, and so expensive, to construct. Large gates require powered machinery to operate them, machinery that must be provided for each set of gates.

Chevron gates can also only resist deep water on one side of the gate, which may be a drawback in some tidal areas where a high tide outside can exceed the depth inside the dock. Where such tides were encountered, sometimes a pair of opposed gates was used, opening outwards away from each other. Provided the water depth between them was kept low, these could resist high water from either direction. A pair of such gates was provided at Penarth Dock, owing to the exceptionally high tidal range of the Bristol Channel beyond.

== Ship caissons ==
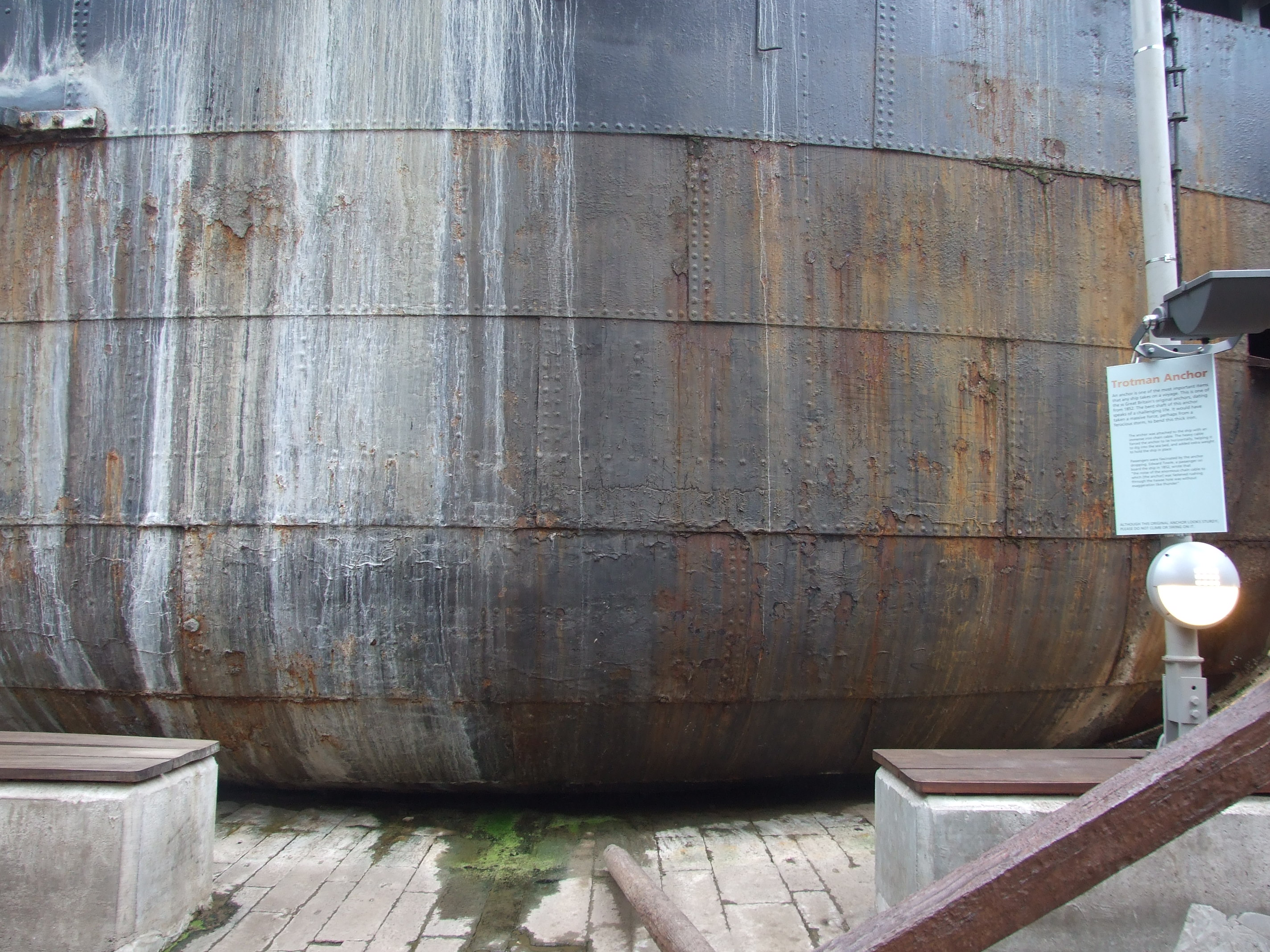
The base of the caisson closing the graving dock where the SS Great Britain was constructed.

The first caissons to be used to close docks in this way were 'ship caissons'. These are a floating hull which resembles that of a particularly tall boat.

This 'bateau-porte' is a seventeenth century French invention. In 1683, Peter Arnold constructed the first for the arsenal dockyard at Rochefort. The first ship caissons were constructed of wood, by traditional boatbuilding methods, but were later of wrought iron plates and later of steel.

Inside the caisson are ballast spaces, filled with water for stability. An upper space is sealed from the rest and this may contain either water, to sink the caisson firmly into its socket in the dock, or else pumped dry and allowing it to float free.

To seal the gate the enlarged 'keel' of the ship caisson fits closely into a groove in the stonework of the lock opening. Flexible material is attached to this prominent keel and seals the water. Originally rope or oakum packing was used. Modern caissons use neoprene rubber. To make use of the pressure of water acting on the caisson, the seal is not placed on the base of the keel, but on the dry side. Water pressure thus presses the caisson, and seal, firmly against the stonework.

For strength, as the caisson has to resist a considerable pressure of deep water against its air-filled ballast spaces, many caissons still retain a curved or boat-shaped hull. In modern caissons this is usually simplified to a single-curvature arch, rather than a compound curved hull. Some shipyards made a particular trade of building caissons or lock gates. Edward Finch's bridge works was established in Chepstow in the mid 19th century to build ironwork for Brunel's Chepstow Railway Bridge directly above it. As the narrowness and high tides of the River Wye limited the size of the ships that could be built there, they came to specialise in caisson work and supplied most of the docks along the Bristol Channel and beyond.

=== L'Hermione ===
L'Hermione is a modern replica of the 1779 frigate. She was constructed in one the graving docks at Rochefort, (Note: The Louis XV dock, later than Arnold's first dock) although now fitted with a modern steel caisson. As this is, by modern standards, now a very small dock, the caisson is constructed simply with flat steel sides. When the newly launched ship was to be undocked from the now-flooded dock, the caisson was floated out, L'Hermione towed out and then the caisson replaced by small tugs.

Undocking of L'Hermione and opening of the ship caisson

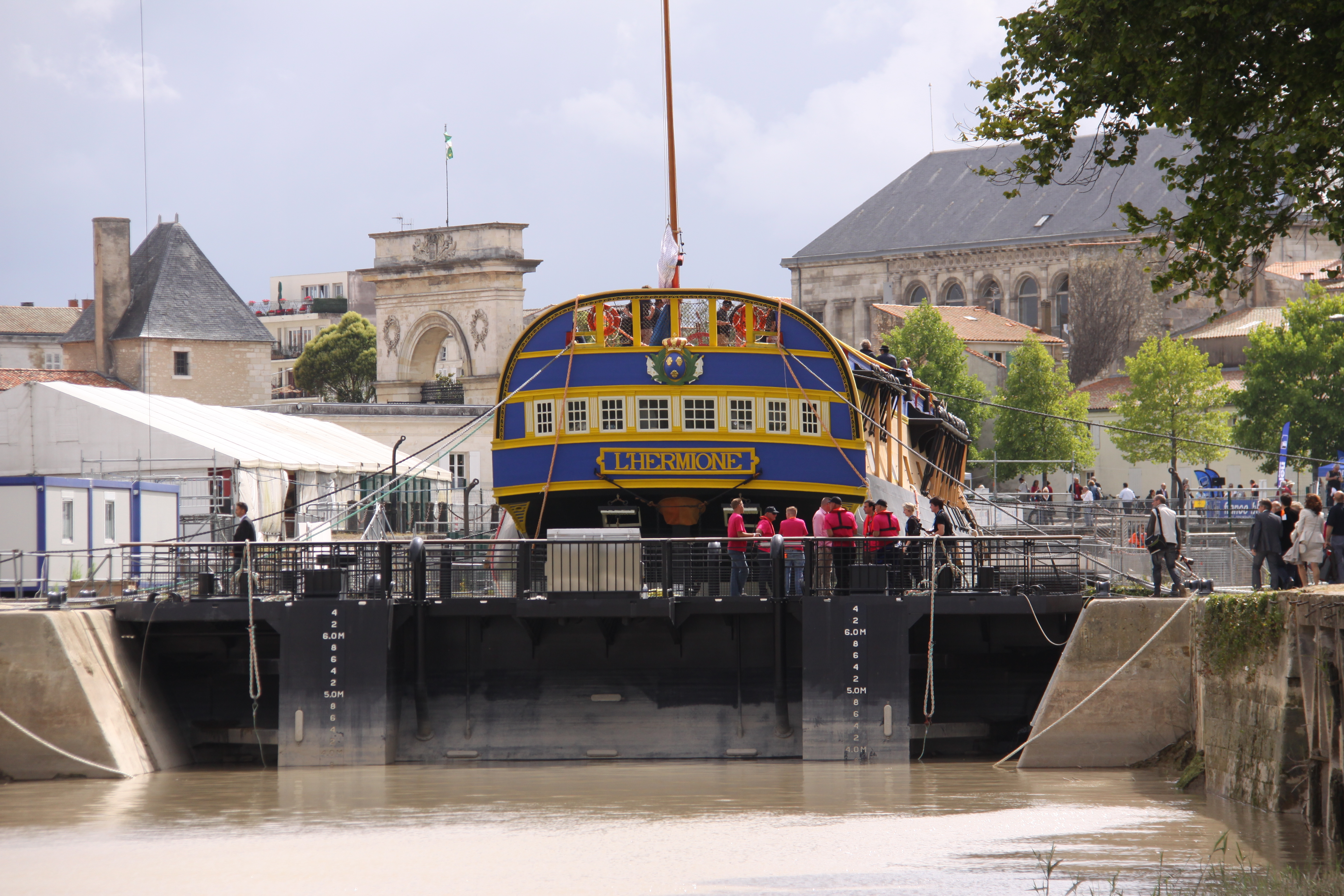

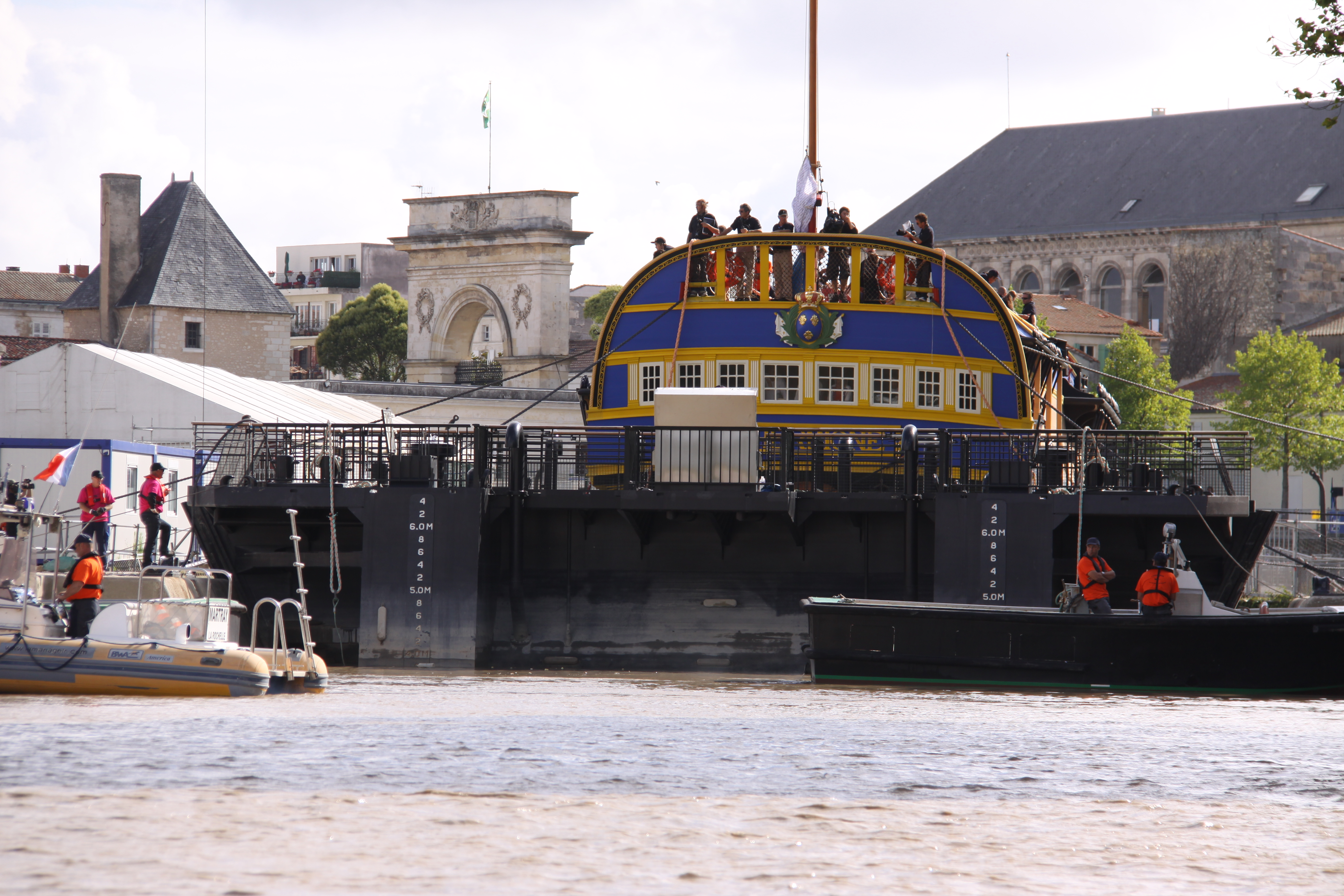

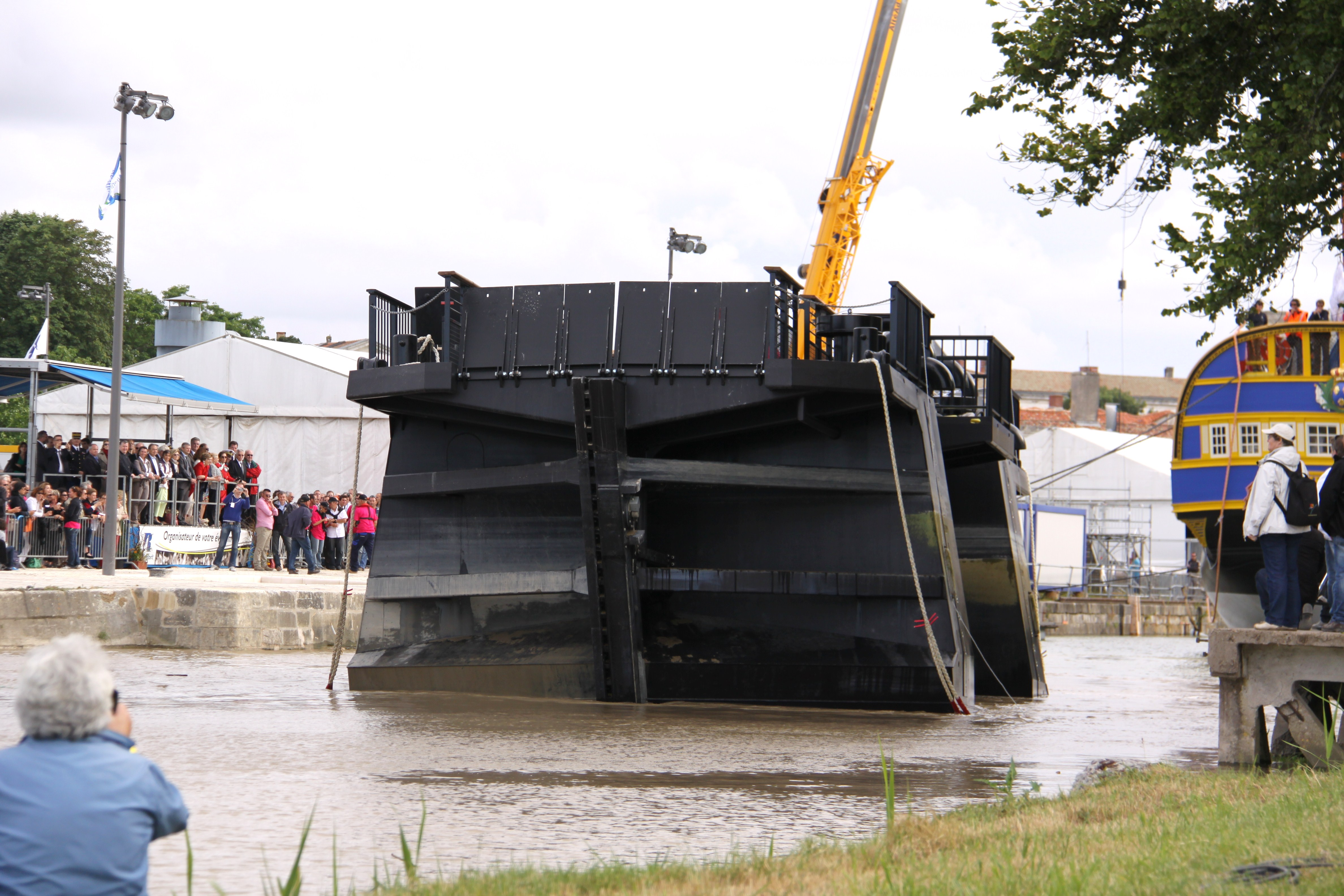

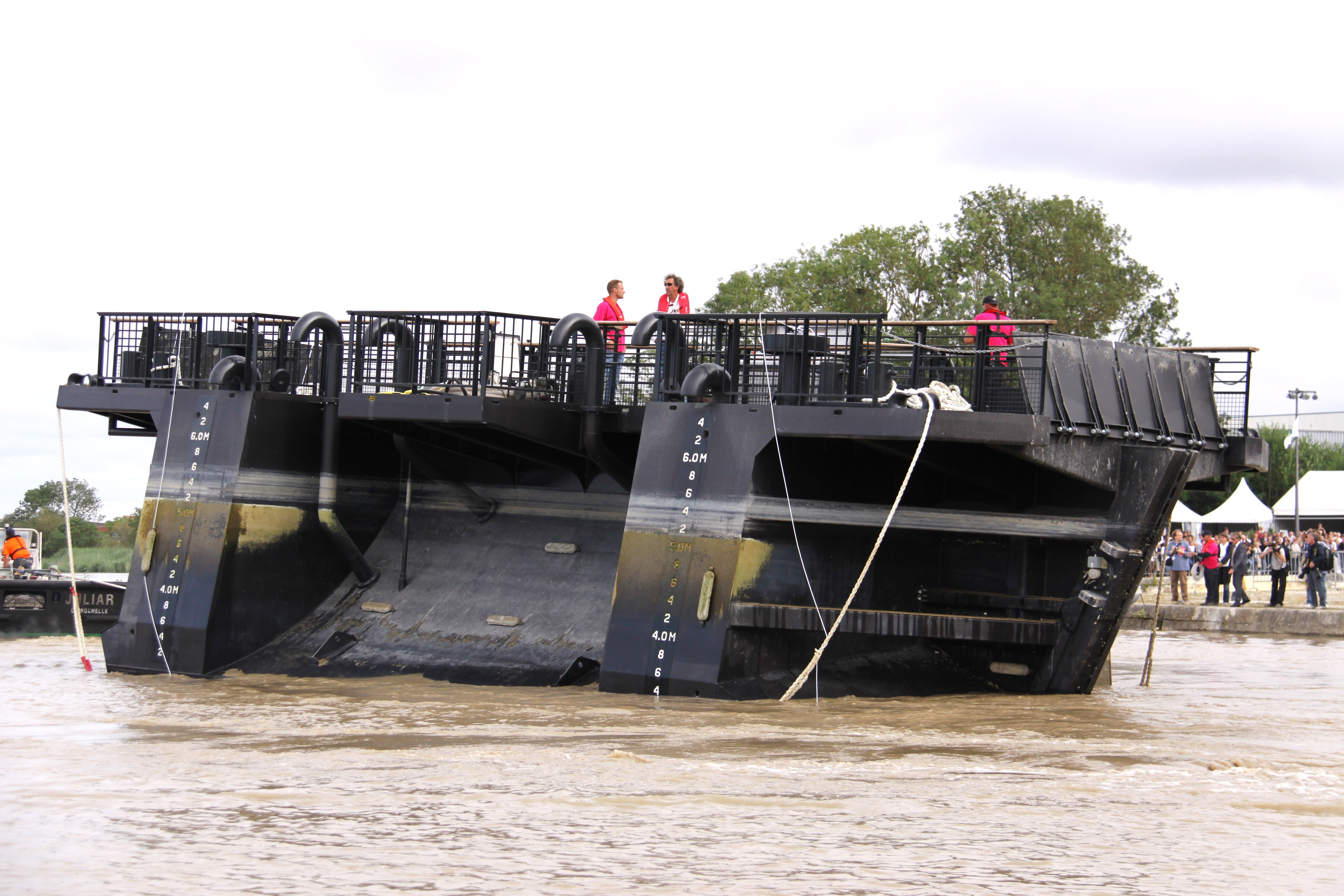

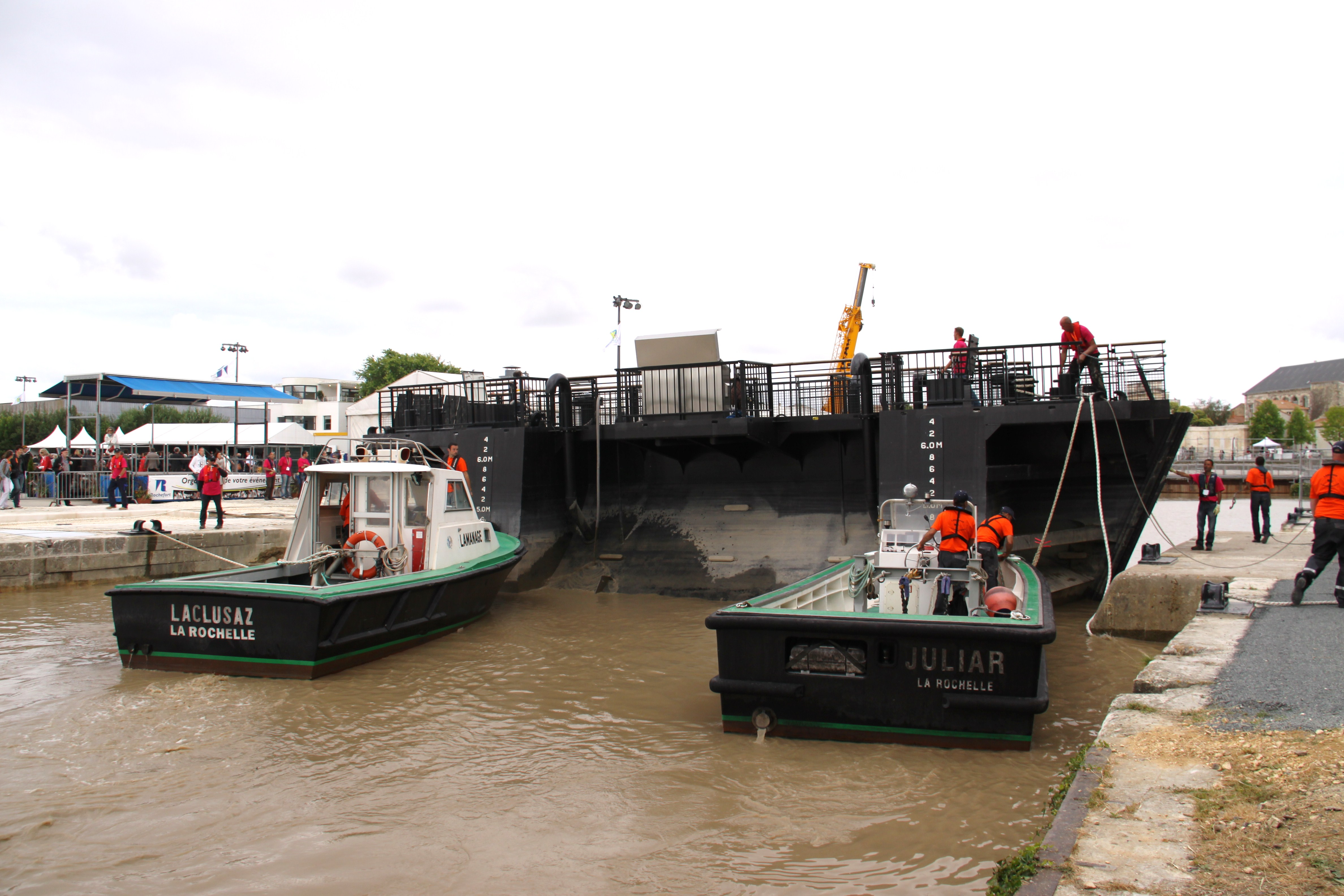

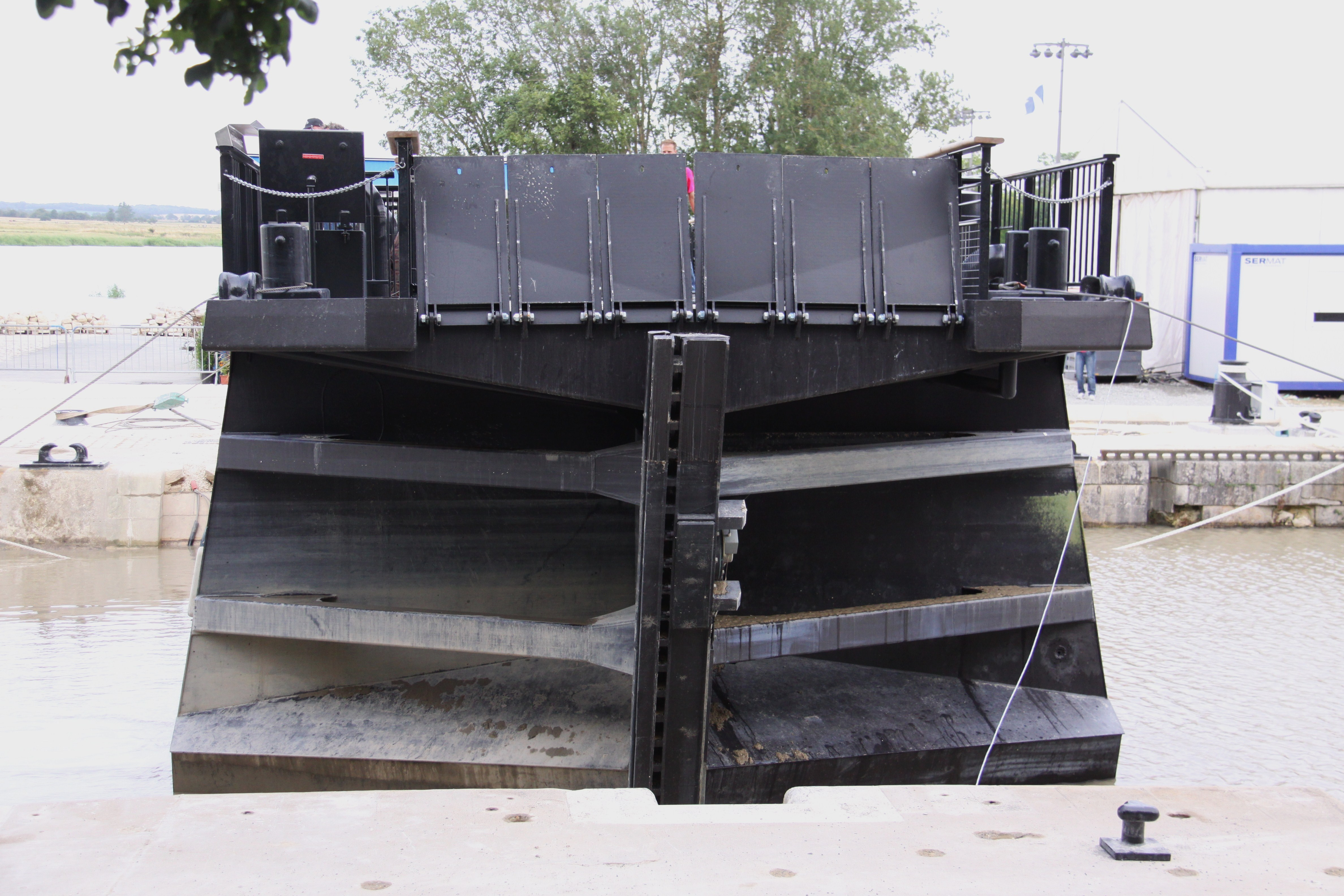

Media related to Maneuvers of the ship caisson of the Louis XV dry dock at the output of the frigate L'Hermione at Wikimedia Commons

== Sliding caissons ==
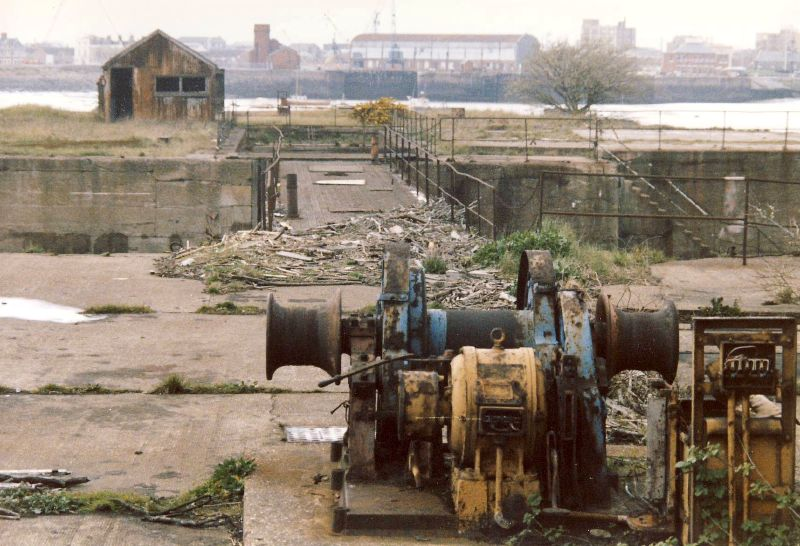
Derelict sliding caisson in Cardiff Docks. The caisson retracted into the recess beyond. It was worked by the cable winch in the foreground.

Ship caissons are slow to operate and so, during the Victorian period, the more efficient 'sliding caisson' (also 'floating-' (Note: The term 'floating caisson' is confusingly sometimes applied to either ship caissons (Vernon-Harcourt) or sliding caissons (British Admiralty).) or 'rolling caisson') was developed. This is a permanent fixture within the dock, like a hinged dock gate, and moves upon a fixed track. The sides of the caisson are vertical, making a narrow rectangular box. Water ballast is used to control its buoyancy, as for the ship caisson, but the floating caisson is then hauled sideways into a recess built into the side of the dock wall. Rolling caissons are a development of sliding caissons fitted with rollers beneath. These do not rely solely on buoyancy to make them portable and so are easier to operate. The caisson may only need to be lifted a few inches to make it movable on its track, which significantly reduces the ballast pumping time compared to a ship caisson. When closing the gate, the track guides it automatically back into place, avoiding the slow maneuvering with tugs or winches necessary to align a ship caisson. Electrically-operated sliding caissons, installed around 1900, on the entrance of the Zeebrugge Canal to the North Sea could operate within two minutes.

Where a caisson is used, means must be provided to pump ballast water out to float it, to move it in and out of position, and to seal around the caisson when in place. Its operating equipment may be part of the gate, if the gate is frequently used, or general dockside equipment such as pumps and capstans may be used if it is rarely used, such as for a dry dock.

The deep recess alongside the dock is in a high-traffic area and so is covered by iron plates when not in use. Usually these need to be lifted clear before the dock gate can be retracted. When closed, the top of the caisson often provides a convenient bridge across the dock. Unlike the chevron gate, this bridge is straight and so may be used for vehicle traffic. (Note: The difficulty of crossing the chevron-gated dock entrance at Bristol's Cumberland Basin led Brunel to develop his first moving swivel bridge.) Busy gates, such as for a canal lock, may have dock sides high enough that the caisson can run beneath them. In this case, the roadway on top of the caisson, or its approach ramps, is lowered to fit beneath.

A further advantage of the floating caisson is that, unlike the hinged gate, it does not need space within the dock to allow it to swing. This increases the useful length within the dock, or may permit a smaller and cheaper dock to be constructed.

Floating caissons were sometimes used in places where a high tidal range made conventional chevron gates impractical.

== Mobile caissons ==
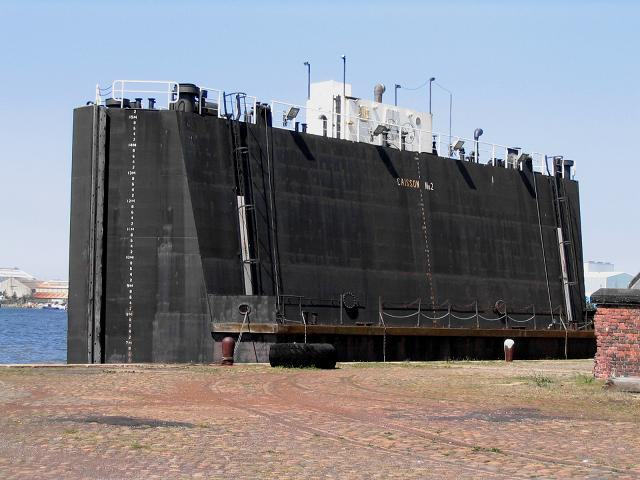
Mobile Caisson No.2, Birkenhead East Float dock

A large system of interconnected docks may sometimes require individual docks to be drained for maintenance. If the connections between docks are made to a standard size, these may be closed off by caissons. As this need is rare, only a few mobile caissons are needed to support an entire dock system. When not in use, the spare caissons are stored floating, out of the way in some other part of the dock.

== See also ==
- Caisson lock, an extremely rare form of canal lock, where barges are transported inside a water-filled cistern.
