= Ardjoeno-class sloop =

Dutch class of steam corvettes

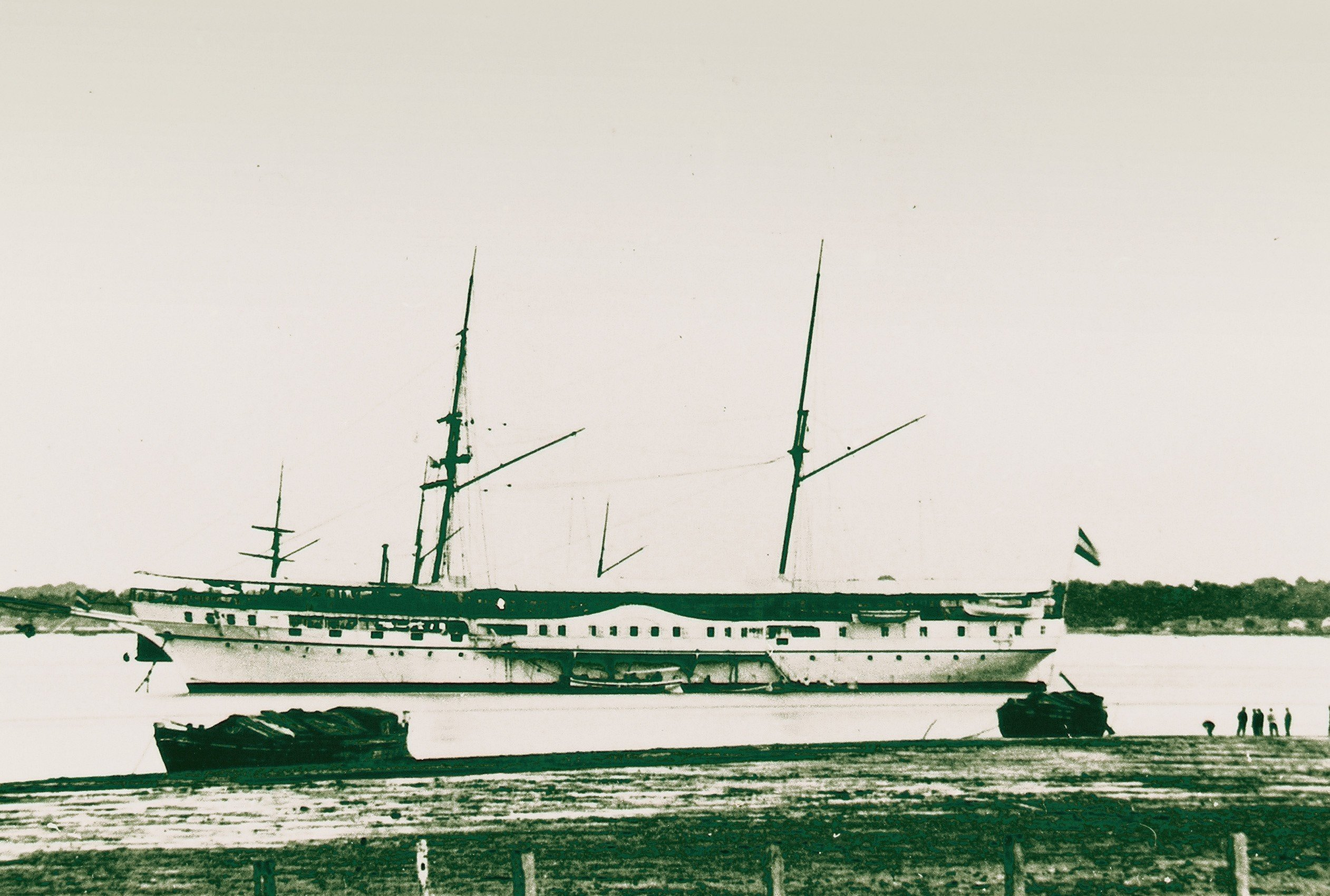
- Paddle Steamer Zr Ms Gedeh (1874) after 1884

Class overview
- Name: Ardjoeno class
- Builders: Rijkswerf Amsterdam, Rijkswerf Rotterdam
- Operators: Royal Netherlands Navy

General characteristics
- Type: paddle steamer sloop
- Displacement: 1,486-1,529 t
- Length: 56.00 m (183 ft 9 in)-57.20 m (187 ft 8 in)
- Beam: 10.70 m (35 ft 1 in)(outside)
- Draught: 4.80 m (15 ft 9 in)
- Installed power: 300 nominal horsepower
- Speed: 9.5–11 knots (17.6–20.4 km/h)(trials)
- Complement: 150
- Armament: 8 guns

The Ardjoeno class was a ship class of paddle-steamers of the Royal Netherlands Navy . The class comprised Ardjoeno, Gedeh (1850), Amsterdam and Gedeh (1874).

== Context ==
=== The Dutch East Indies ===
After the Netherlands had regained their independence in 1813, the United Kingdom returned the former Dutch possessions in nowadays Indonesia and Malaysia. The Netherlands then had to reinstate their authority in the far east, but this was not easy for the small and ruined country. The English were soon encroaching on their territory and founded Singapore in 1819, causing huge damage to Dutch interests. It was an ultimate consequence of the Dutch not being able to put up a fight against the United Kingdom, but this was not all.

The Dutch had a low measure of actual control of their East Indian possessions. Outside their few centers of power, most of their rule was indirect, via local rulers. Without actual control of more remote parts of the Indonesian archipelago, other states could occupy territory without immediately coming to blows with the Dutch military. In such cases it was doubtful whether the international community would see the invading state as the aggressor. This would be especially the case if a territory was plagued by piracy.

=== Steamships for the Indies ===
In the vast area of the Dutch East Indies the Dutch had a surprisingly limited number of ships. On 1 January 1842 these were: The guard ship Van Speijk (later Medusa), The medium frigates Bellona (44) and Rotterdam (28), the corvettes Triton (28). Argo (32), and Boreas (28), the brigs Koerier (18), Panter (18), Meermin (18), Vliegende Visch (14), Postillon (14) and two other brigs, 10 schooners, 5 row-gunboats, the paddle-steamer Phoenix (7), and the iron paddle-steamers Banda (ex-Hekla) and Etna (ex-Ternate).

On 1 June 1842 RA J.G. Rijk started as director for the navy. What was above all necessary were steamships and small well-sailing vessels. One can imagine that the heavier units of the Dutch fleet could easily defeat pirates, but then they first needed catch up with the pirates. For the schooners their supremacy over pirate ships was not that obvious. On 5 July 1842 the navy schooner Krokodil was attacked in Bali Strait by 7 pirate ships which tried to board her. The attacks were repealed with the loss of four wounded and some damage to the ship.

In 1844 the paddle steamers Bromo and Merapi arrived in the Dutch East Indies. These each had two 22 cm grenade guns and six medium 30-pounder cannon, 220 nominal hp, and displaced 1,367 t. The later influential writer M.H. Jansen was impressed by the Bromo class. He described the ideal type of steamship for the Indies as a 450-550 hp ship, modeled on Bromo, and with suitable arrangements to embark and land troops. He also thought to give these ships high caliber grenade guns (60-pounders) as well as some high caliber Smooth Bore Muzzle Loading cannon (36-pounders).

While naval minister (since 18 June 1844) Rijk had not ordered the Bromo class, he did order the Ardjoeno class.

== Ordering and construction ==
=== Construction ===
Construction started when on 4 February 1848 Ardjoeno was laid down at the Rijkswerf Amsterdam.

=== Naming ===
Adjoeno was named after Arjuno-Welirang, a volcano on Java. Gedeh was named after Mount Gede on Java. Amsterdam was first named Salak, after Mount Salak on Java.

== Characteristics of the Ardjoeno class ==
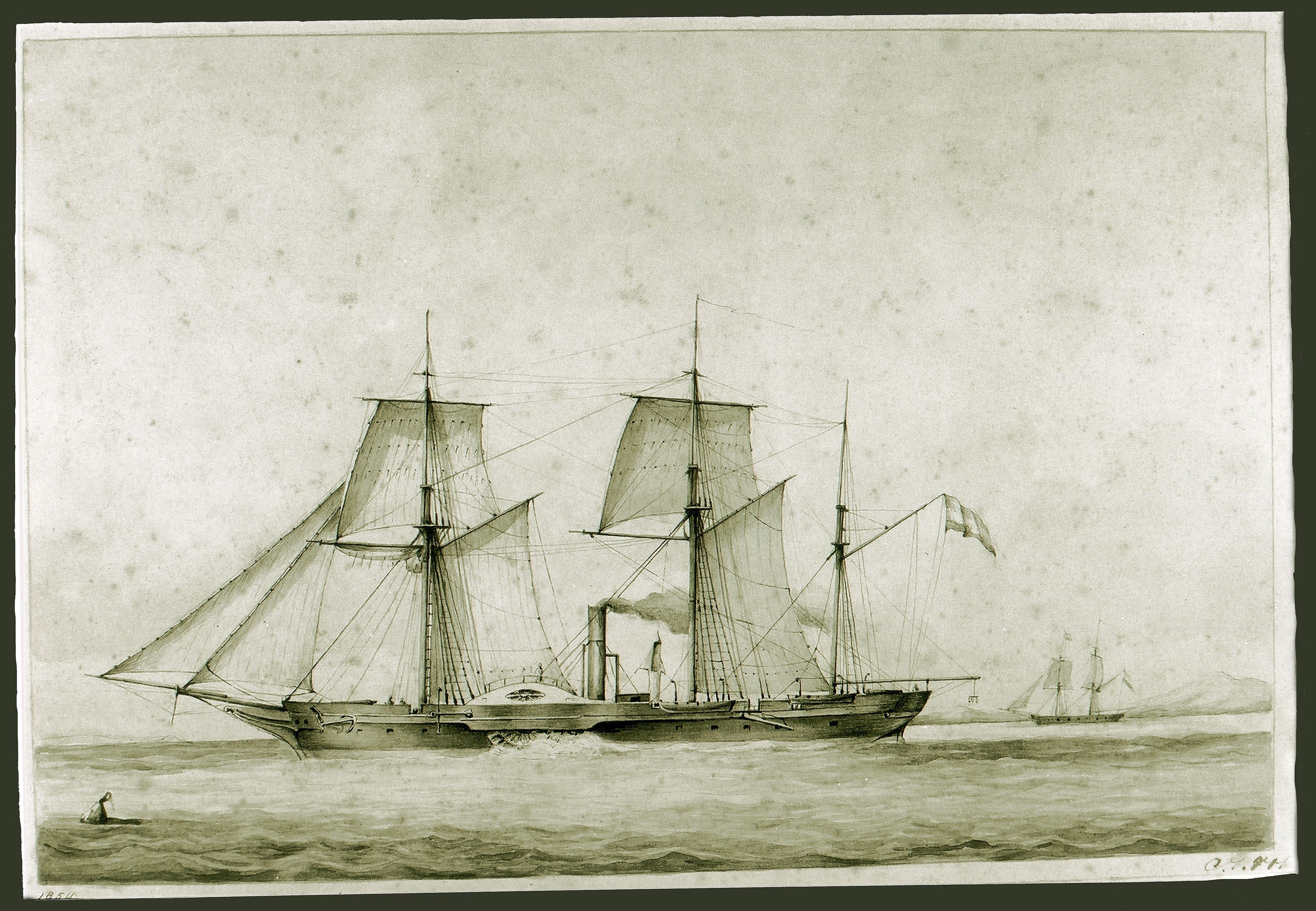
HNLMS Amsterdam (1852) in 1854

=== Design ===
As regards dimensions, the Ardjoeno class was the biggest steamship built up to that date in the Netherlands. The class was only about 10% larger than the preceding Bromo class, and might have had the same armament from the start. The real difference was a 36% increase in engine power.

=== Armament ===
When Ardjoeno arrived in Nieuwediep in April 1850, it had 2 grenade guns of 80 pound, 4 'grenade guns' of 30 pound, and 2 long 'grenade guns' of 30 pound. What was probably meant was 2 * 80-pdr grenade guns, 4 medium 30-pdr, 2 long 30-pdr. On 1 January 1869 Ardjoeno and Amsterdam were said to have 2 grenade guns of 80 pounds, and 6 long 30-pounders.

=== Propulsion ===
The Ardjoeno class had two engines which combined generated 300 nominal hp. The engines of Ardjoeno were made by Fijenoord, those for Gedeh by Van Vlissingen en Dudok van Heel. On 30 May 1850 Ardjoeno made her first trial run from Nieuwdiep. The machinery was good, but had an unexpectedly high coal consumption. In a head wind Ardjoeno made 9.5 knots, with a tail wind 11 knots. It was noted to be faster than other steamships of the Dutch navy

The class had three masts with a barque sail plan. The second Gedeh is shown on photographs without a mizzen mast.

== Construction dates ==
The fourth ship of the class, HNLMS Gedeh (1874), is a special case. During the treatment of the 1871 budget for the East Indies, there was talk about a plan to build a new ship of the Gedeh type in order to re-use the steam engines of Gedeh (1850). Critics disapproved the idea, saying that a smaller ship could do the same service, and that the old machinery was very inefficient. Nevertheless, in Surabaya construction of 'a paddle-steamer first class of 300 hp (type Amsterdam)' was started. Later, authorities concluded that the duties of the big paddle-steamers could indeed be done more efficiently by smaller ships, and in May 1873 they decided to finish Gedeh (1874) as a Guard ship.

Name	Built by	Laid down	Launched	Commissioned	Fate
Ardjoeno (ex-Pluto)	Rijkswerf Amsterdam	4 February 1848	3 September 1849	1 April 1850	Sold 6 December 1873
Gedeh (1850)	Rijkswerf Rotterdam	25 October 1848	26 April 1850	16 April 1851	Sold 29 November 1862
Amsterdam (ex-Salak)	Rijkswerf Amsterdam	13 Juni 1850	19 February 1852	16 May 1853	Decomm. 20 March 1872
Gedeh (1874)	M.E. Surabaya	10 June 1871	17 June 1874	c. Oct 1875	Decomm. 1 June 1899
