= 17 cm RK L/25 =

1870s German naval artillery gun

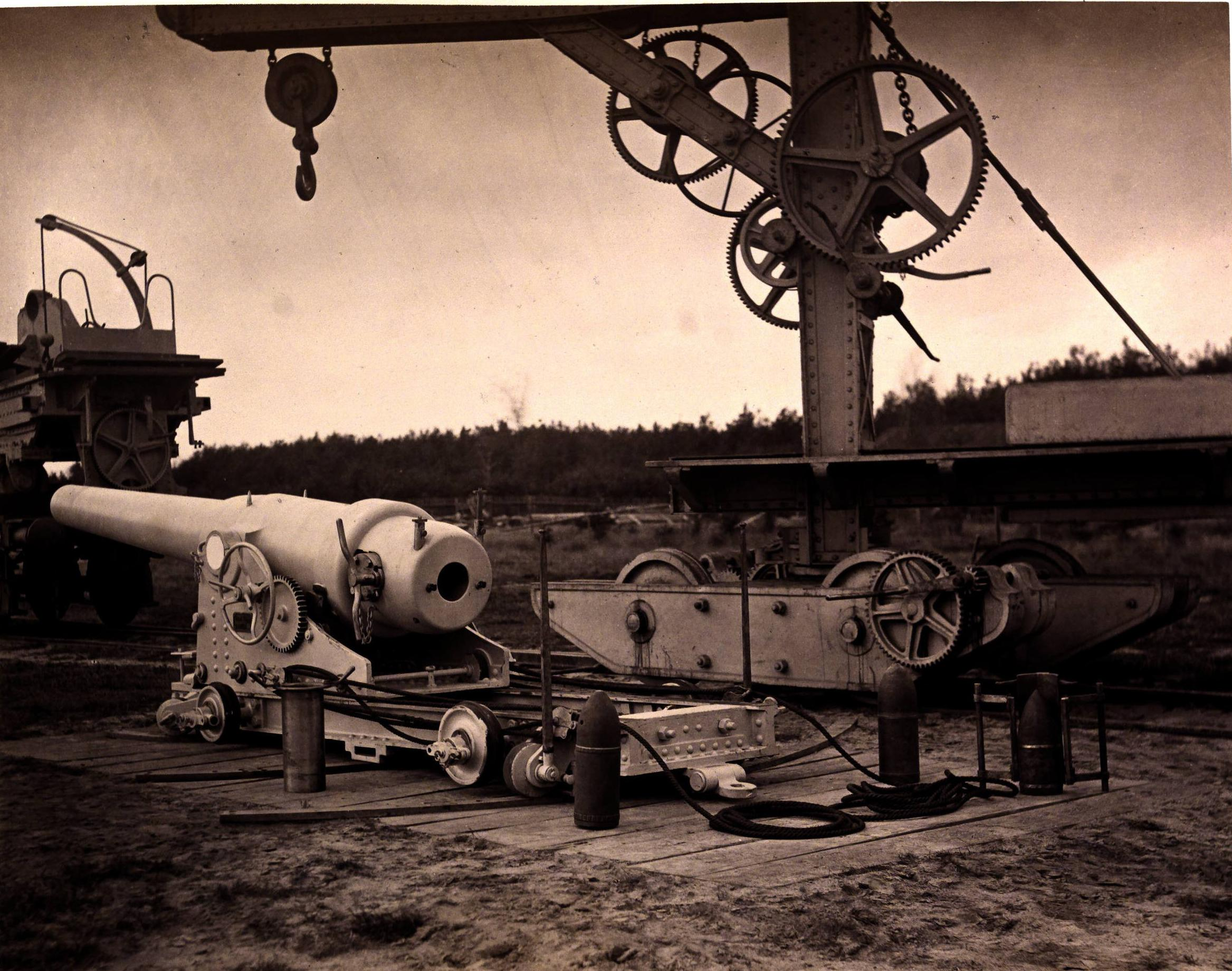
- The Krupp 17 cm RK L/25 gun
- Type: Naval gun; Coastal artillery
- Place of origin: German Empire

Service history
- In service: 1877–1902 (Dutch Navy)
- Used by: Imperial German Navy; Royal Netherlands Navy

Production history
- Designer: Krupp
- Manufacturer: Krupp

Specifications ((L/25))
- Mass: 5,600 kg
- Length: 4.250 m
- Caliber: 172.6 mm
- Muzzle velocity: 524 m/s.

The 17 cm RK L/25 was a gun from a family of German naval artillery guns developed in the 1870s. Before World War I, the gun was used on warships of the Imperial German Navy, the Royal Netherlands Navy, and other navies.

== Context ==
=== Sailing limited gun size ===
Until the 1890s cruisers were still built with masts for a full sailing rig. This differed from the emergency (or opportunity) rigging of (armored) ships that operated closer to home ports. In times of war, the range of cruisers sailing on coal alone was limited. E.g. a trip to the East Indies could not be made on coal alone without bunkering somewhere along the way. Cruisers therefore needed to be able to effectively use their sails to economize to economize on coal.

The requirement for cruisers to still be good sailing ships posed an effective limit on the size of the guns mounted on them. In the early 1880s, the captain of the Dutch cruiser Tromp noted that: In France, the heaviest cruiser gun was 16 cm. In the United Kingdom it was 18 cm (the Dutch also used the British RML 7-inch Armstrong Gun), and in Germany it was 17 cm. "Though of a shorter model than the Dutch used."

=== Minimum gun size to penetrate armor ===
The demand for a gun of about 7-inch (178 mm) was fed by early trials of rifled guns against armored ships. These indicated that a 17 cm rifled muzzle loader, or RML, was the absolute minimum required to penetrate armor, see RML 7-inch Armstrong Gun.

In 1860, Prussia tested 15 cm, 12 cm, and 9 cm cannon against a target resembling a wooden ship hull. The results indicated that the 15 cm and 12 cm cannon were very useful for coastal defense. In February 1861 Germany held trials with the same caliber guns against a mock up target resembling the hull of an armored ship. I.e. an armor plate of 114 mm thickness with a supporting wooden backing of 63 cm. The result was that none of the solid shot of the 15 cm guns was able to entirely penetrate the wooden backing, only a few splinters of iron came through now and then. Shortly after the 8–9 March 1862 Battle of Hampton Roads, the Prussian Artillerie Prüfungskommission (artillery test commission) then advised to develop a 36-pounder (17 cm) gun on 16 April 1862.

The Dutch navy standardized on muzzle loading guns made by the Armstrong company in Elswick. It opted to use the RML 9-inch Armstrong Gun for most armored ships, and preferably, the 7-inch Armstrong RML for cruisers, corvettes and gun vessels.

== History ==
=== The 17 cm RK L/25 ===
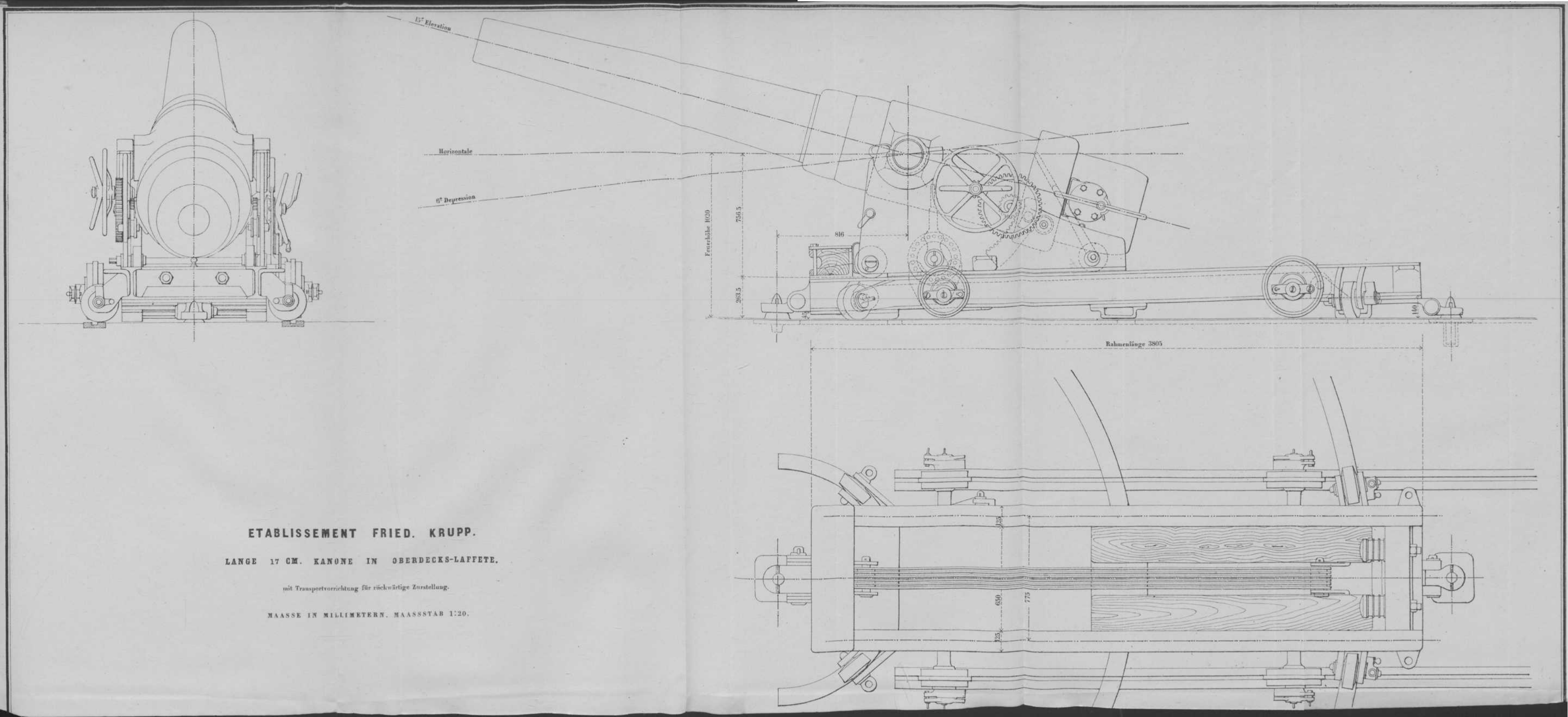
Design drawing of the gun

In 1870, the German Navy ministry agreed with Krupp on the construction of a long 17 cm gun weighing 112 Quintal. It would be used as a chase gun on the armored turret ships. These guns became known as 'lange 17 cm Ringröhre'. The first barrel cast for this gun was No. 5. A slightly revised barrel No. 6 was then accepted as the final design in April 1874.

Weight of the gun was 5,600 kg. This indeed equals the 112 quintal (112 * 50) mentioned above. The breechblock was weighed separately at 238 kg. The exact length of the barrel was 4,250 mm. As a rifled barrel, the inside diameter of the barrel was 172.6 mm and 175.8 mm.

In June 1874 the trials with the L/25 and the shell (Langgranate) showed many problems. The copper driving bands on the shell which had to rotate it, broke off very often. The shell itself often shattered on impact. In December 1874 the admiralty then decided to again use soft lead on the hull of the c/75 shell.

In 1875, the official data was that the long 17 cm gun fired a solid c/69 shot of 55.8 kg with a charge of 12 kg and a velocity of 472 m/s. It fired a new shell (Langgranate) c/75 of 51 kg using a powder charge of 10 kg for a speed of 464 m/s.

In 1885, this gun was renamed from 'lange 17 Ring-Kanone' to '17 cm Ring-Kanone L/25' and abbreviated 17 cm RK L/25.

=== The 17 cm 5,000 kg ===
In late 1871, the admiralty ordered a 17 cm gun of 5,000 kg. It was called kurze 17 cm Kanone (short 17 cm cannon) and was to be used on (unarmored) steam corvettes. However, it proved too heavy to use on board these steam corvettes.

When the 17 cm light gun (below) was built, the four kurze 17 cm Kanone which had already been built became known as: kurze 17 cm Ring Kanone mit Flachkeil.

The weight of this gun was 5,000 kg. The breechblock weighed 220 kg. The exact length of the barrel was 3,400 mm.

=== The 17 cm RK L/20 ===
In 1874 a shorter 17 cm gun weighing only 3,450 kg was designed. This lighter gun got the designation kurze leichte 17 cm Kanone (short light 17 cm cannon). The four 5,000 kg guns which had already been built (above) retained the designation kurze 17 cm Kanone.

After several trials, the final design of the short light 17 cm cannon was finalized in fall 1876. The short light guns then got the designation: kurze 17 cm Ring Kanone (17 cm RK light). As this was already in use for the 17 cm of 5,000 kg, the 5,000 kg pieces were rebranded as kurze 17 cm Ring Kanone mit Flachkeil.

The exact weight of the gun was 3.475 kg. The breechblock weighted 188 kg. The barrel length was 3.450 mm. This would result in a length of L/20.

The 17 cm light gun shot a 3 caliber long grenade (Langgranate) using a charge of 7.5 kg, which gave the projectile a speed of 410 m/s as it exited the barrel.

In 1885, this gun was renamed from 'kurze 17 Ring-Kanone' to '17 cm Ring-Kanone L/20' and abbreviated as 17 cm RK L/20.

== Users ==
=== International designation ===
The 17 cm RK L/25's weight of 5.6 t (Tonne or metric ton) is the same as 5,51 lt (Long ton). Still enough for Brassey's Naval Annual to designate the Dutch 17 cm A No. 1 gun on Atjeh as 17 cm 6-ton Krupp. Brassey also noted a 17-cm 5.5 t gun and a 17-cm 3.5 t on board a German cruiser. Therefore, Brassey's identified the 17 cm RK L/25 as Krupp 5.5 or 6 t. It identified the 17 cm RK L/20 as 17-cm 3.5 t.

=== Germany ===
In Germany the ironclad ships of the Preussen class each had four 26 cm RK L/22 guns and two 17 cm RK L/25, one at the bow and one at the stern. These were obviously the chase guns mentioned above. The ironclad SMS Prinz Adalbert (1865) was later re-armed with two 17 cm guns.

Of the unarmored ships, the Leipzig-class corvettes were the so-called covered gun deck corvettes for which the 17 cm 5,000 kg had been designed. SMS Leipzig and SMS Prinz Adalbert both had 2 * 17 cm RK L/25 and 10 * 17 cm RK L/20.

=== Netherlands ===
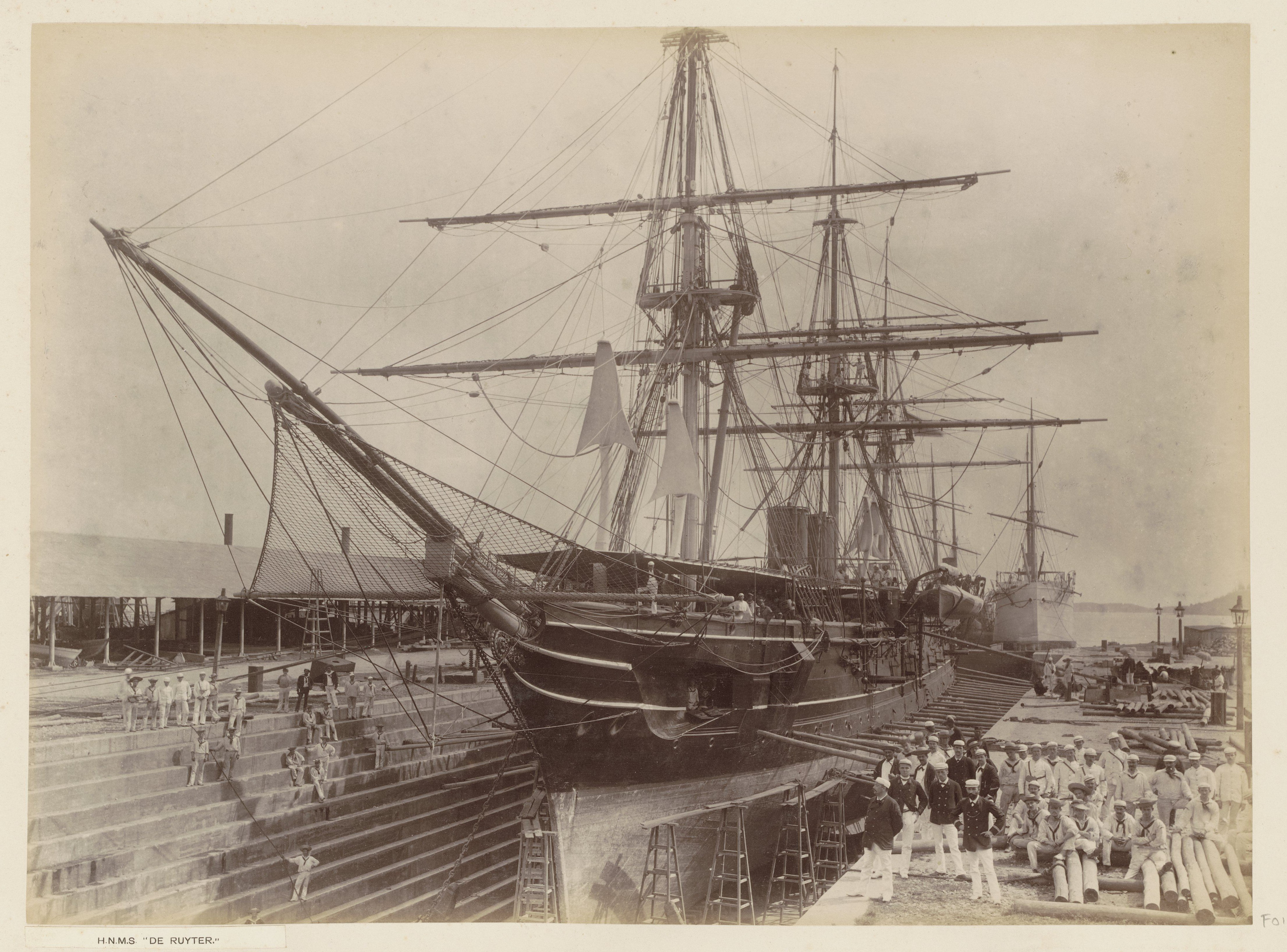
Atjeh class cruiser with 17 cm and 12 cm guns sticking out

In 1877 the Dutch navy held shooting trials near Den Helder against armor plates of about an inch thick. The surprising result was that a 17 cm Krupp breechloader gun seemed to have more penetrative power than the 9-inch Armstrong gun. (Even though the outcome might have been influenced by the Armstrong shot pulverizing on impact.) It confirmed the Dutch in their earlier decision to change the armament of the Atjeh-class cruisers to the 17 cm RK L/25 Krupp gun. (Otherwise Atjeh would have had a single RML 9-inch Armstrong Gun on the center line combined with other guns.) A later publication showed that based on gun characteristics alone, the 9-inch (22.9 cm) Armstrong gun was actually slightly better than the Krupp 17 cm.

In 1895, the Dutch artillery specialist Mouton gave the weight of the Dutch 17 cm A No. 1 gun as 5,600 kg. He stated the length as 4.250 m, and the caliber as 0.1726 m. Dividing 4.250 by 0.1726 gives an L/25 length for the Dutch no. 1.

Later, the Dutch also had a 17 cm A No. 2. Mouton stated the weight as 7.650 kg and the length as 6.040 m. The caliber was of course the same. The length of the 17 cm A No. 2 as used on board HNLMS Koningin Wilhelmina der Nederlanden was given as L/35. This is confirmed by dividing 6.040 by 0.1726. It is not clear whether this was a lengthened version of the 17 cm RK L/25 or a different model.

On their last trips to the Dutch East Indies, some of the Atjeh class cruisers left their 17 cm battery behind for coastal defense of the Indies. In the later 1890s, Atjeh and De Ruyter left their 17 cm guns in Surabaya before returning to the Netherlands. Emma followed suit. Tromp would leave her main guns in Sabang, Aceh.

=== Japan ===
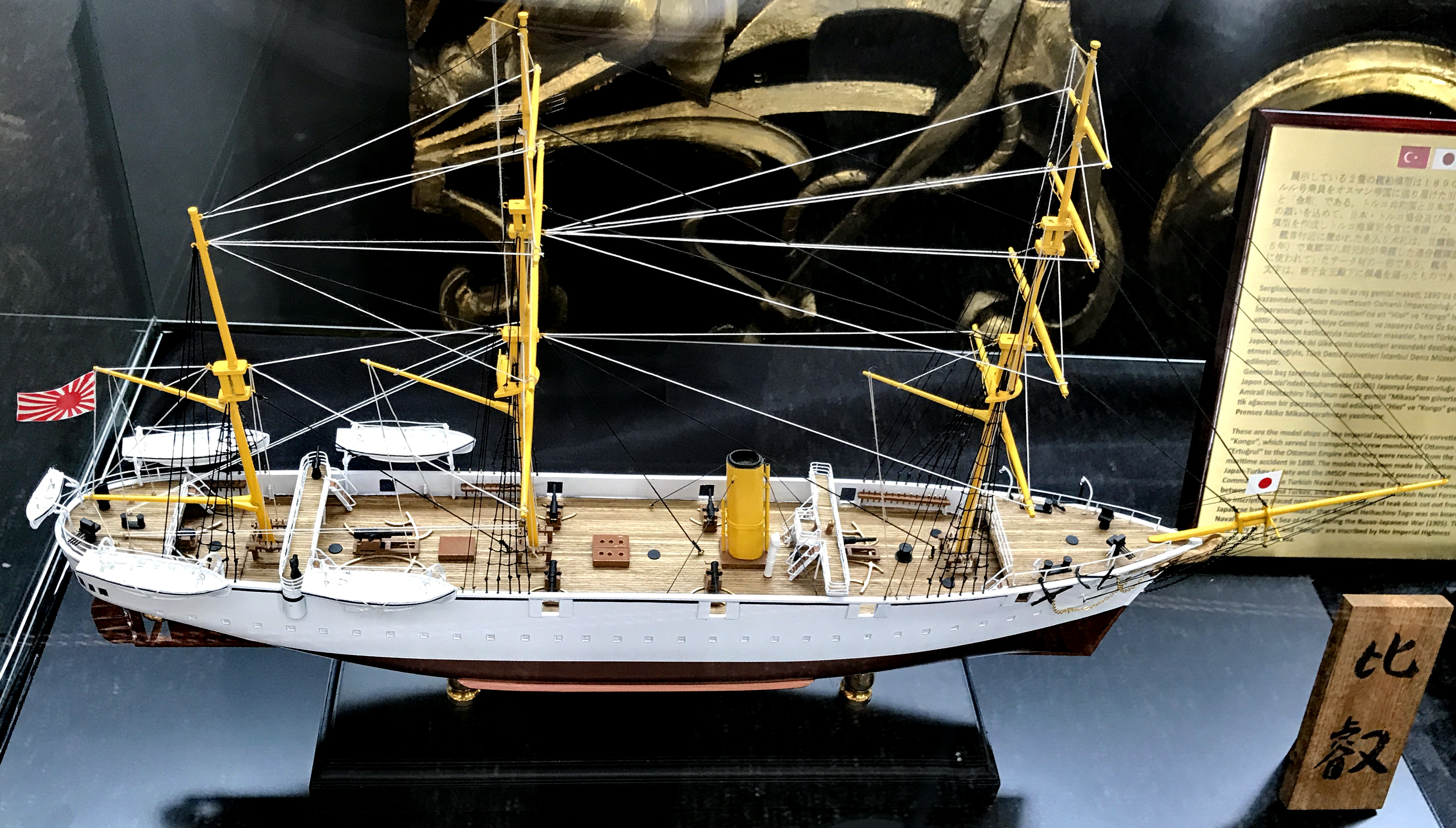
model of Hiei showing the position of her guns

In June 1875 Japan held comparative trials of naval guns which the emperor attended. There were armor plates of 114, 152, and 203 mm thickness made by Cammell Laird of Sheffield. They had a two feet thick supporting wood layer behind them. The participating guns were: the Krupp long 17 cm breech loader, the Krupp long 15 cm breechloader, and the RML 7-inch Armstrong Gun, all on ship carriages. The Krupp guns used prismatic gun powder, the British gun used Pebble-powder. The Krupp 17 cm gun fired with a charge of 11.8 kg, the British 7-inch with 13.6 kg. The results showed that the Krupp 17 cm clearly outclassed the British 7-inch gun.

In Japan, the ironclad Fusō had four 24 cm guns and two 17 cm RK L/25, used as chase guns. The ironclad corvette Ryūjō later got two 17 cm RK L/25 as main armament.

The two armored corvettes of the Kongō-class ironclads, Hiei and Kongo, each had three 17 cm RK L/20 as main armament and 6 15 cm Krupp guns. The 17 cm RK L/20 were on the center line, while the 15 cm guns were in broadside mountings.

On unarmored ships, the Japanese used the 17 cm RK L/25 on the corvettes Kaimon and Tenryū.

=== Other users ===
In Greece, the Vasilissa Olga had four 17 cm RK L/25 and two 17 cm RK L/20. The cruiser Navarchos Miaoulis had three 17 cm RK L/25 and one 17 cm RK L/20.
