= Onrust Dock of 5,000 tons =

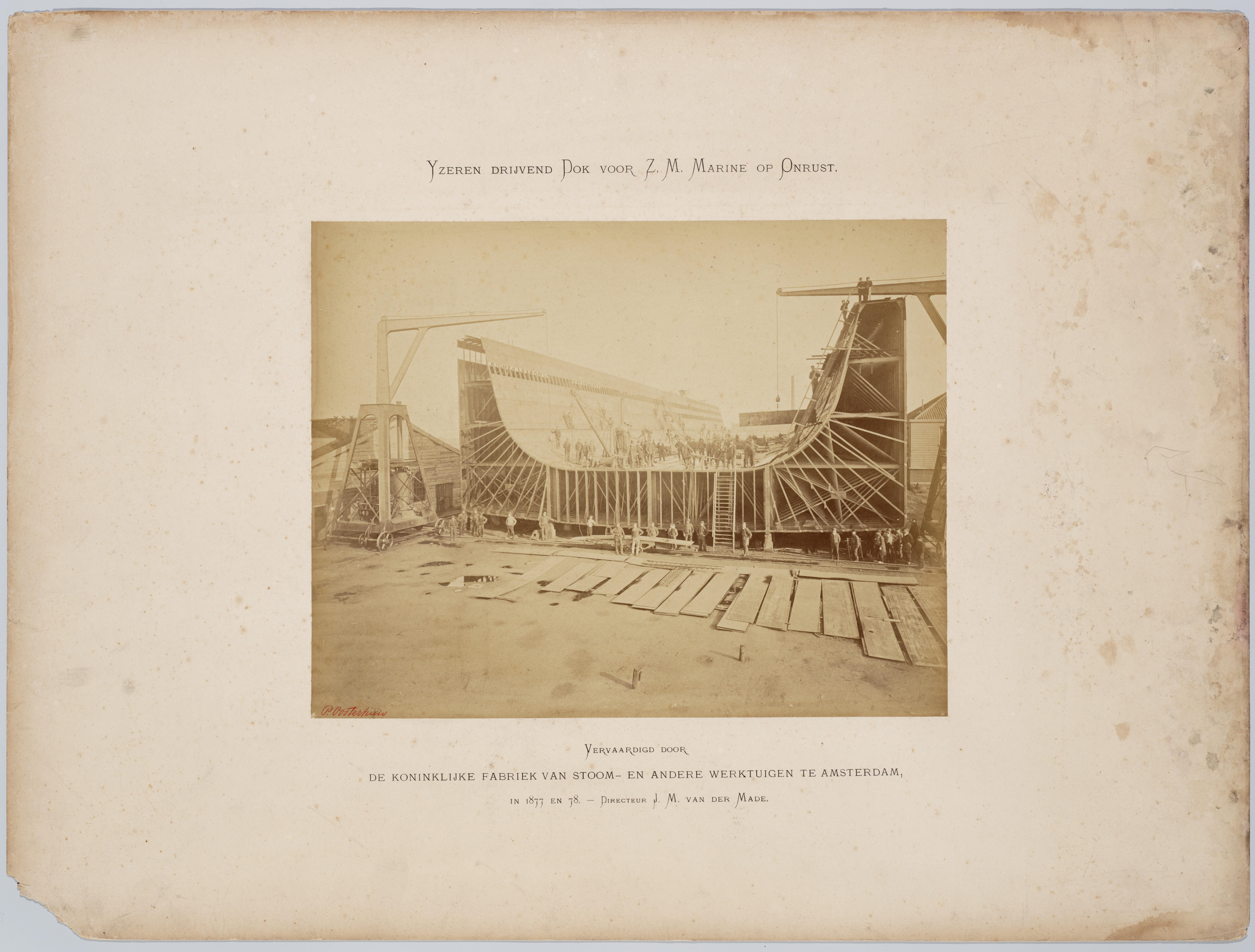
- Onrust Dock of 5,000 tons under construction in Amsterdam on 25 June 1878

History

Netherlands
- Name: Onrust Dock of 5,000 tons
- Builder: Koninklijke Fabriek
- Laid down: 14 June 1879
- Launched: 6 June 1880
- Commissioned: 1880
- Decommissioned: 1924
- Stricken: January 1926
- Home port: Onrust Island, Indonesia; 6.033°S 106.733°E

General characteristics (as completed)
- Length: 100.00 m (328.1 ft)
- Beam: 27.00 m (88.6 ft)
- Draft: 1.516 m (5.0 ft) (empty)
- Depth of hold: 12.50 m (41.0 ft)(max.); 3.80 m (12.5 ft) (pontoon)

Onrust Dock of 5,000 tons, was a floating dry dock which served in the Dutch East Indies from 1881 till 1924.

== Context ==
In 1876 the Dutch navy became interested in the construction of a new dock for the Dutch East Indies. This would later be called Onrust Dock of 5,000 tons. At the time it was clear that the naval situation in the East Indies was changing. The first of the unprotected Atjeh-class cruisers were under construction, and the small battleship HNLMS Koning der Nederlanden had been launched. At the time of the proposition, the ironclad HNLMS Prins Hendrik der Nederlanden was sailing to the Dutch East Indies. Most of these ships all had about 3,500 tons displacement, while Koning der Nederlanden displaced 5,300 tons. A dry dock that could lift 5,000 tons could lift all these ships, except (perhaps) for the Koning der Nederlanden. When Onrust Dock of 5,000 tons had been assembled in the Dutch East Indies it was said to be meant for the two armored ships.

The order for Onrust Dock of 5,000 tons can also be considered from the context of the Aceh War increasing the demand for dry dock capacity. The new dock would replace the 1843 wooden dry dock that was in use by the East Indies at the time.

== Construction and commissioning ==
=== Design ===
In May 1876 a commission to design a new dry dock for the naval base at Onrust Island was appointed to oversee construction. The staff consisted of: Dr. B.J. Tideman (chief engineer of the navy and adviser for shipbuilding in Amsterdam); J. Strootman (chief engineer of Waterstaat in Assen); Jhr. H.O. Wichers (Captain-lieutenant and chief of the equipment department of the navy), and J. de Hoog (engineer for shipbuilding at the Dutch Society of Insurers). Tideman was the designer of Batavia Dock which was still on the slipway at Untung Jawa (Amsterdam Island). Strootman was one of the designers of Onrust Dock of 3,000 tons, which had been assembled in Surabaya and was already in service.

=== Ordering ===
In September 1876 450,000 guilders were brought on the colonial budget for 1877. The total cost of the new dry dock was estimated at 969,000 guilders including transport. On 21 November 1876 there was a tender for the dry dock. Of 14 offers, 7 were discarded because they contained conditions. The others were:

Name	Place	Country	Offer
Koninklijke Fabriek	Amsterdam	Netherlands	781,000
Kon. Mij. de Schelde	Vlissingen	Netherlands	788,976
Société J. F. Cail & Cie	Paris	France	797,000
Meursing & Huijgens	Amsterdam	Netherlands	834,950
P. Haverkamp	Amsterdam	Netherlands	859,000
Nederlandse Stoomboot Maatschappij (NSBM)	Rotterdam	Netherlands	865,000
Christie, Nolet en de Kuijper	Rotterdam	Netherlands	951,000

=== Construction ===
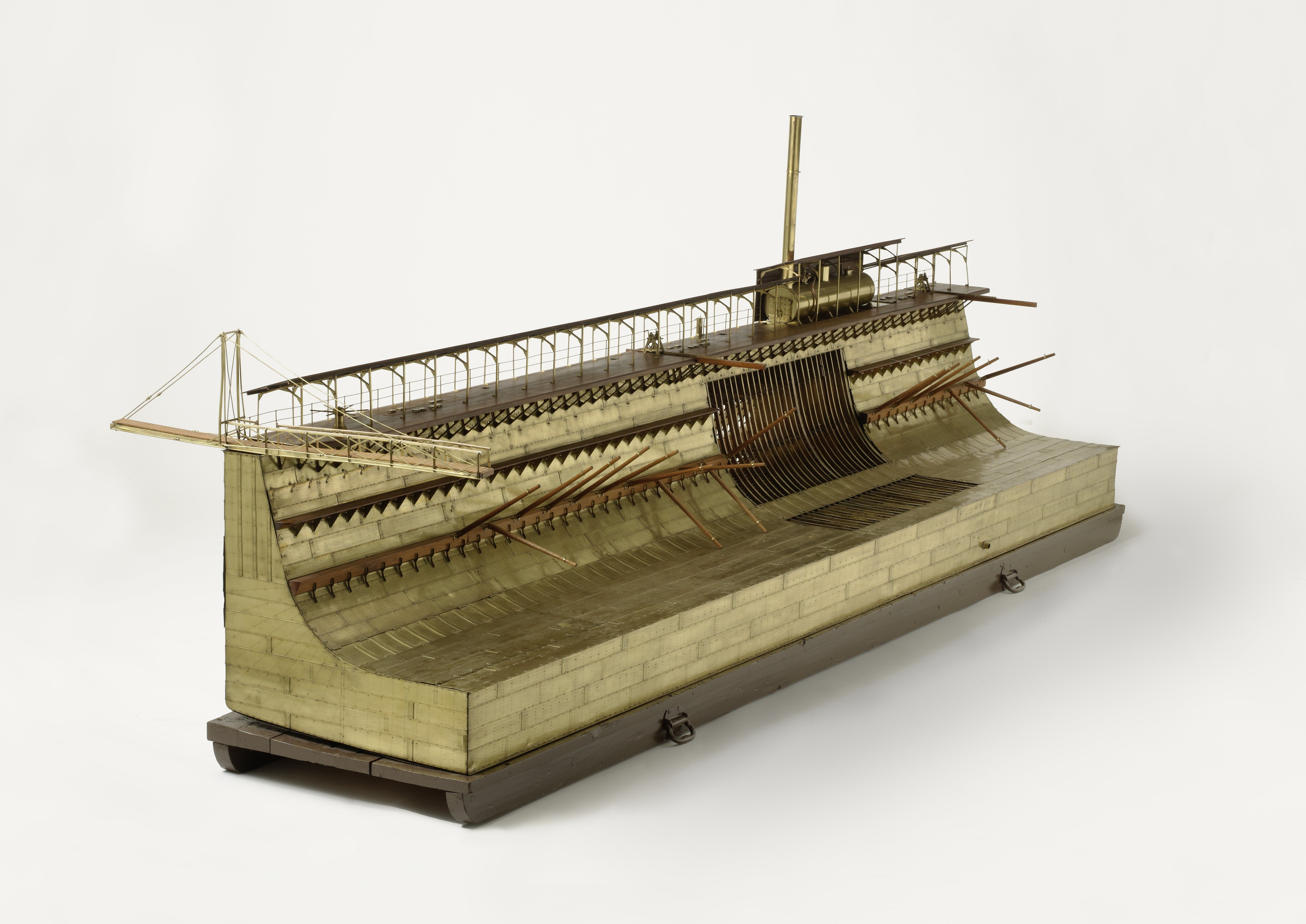
Contemporary brass model of Onrust Dock of 5,000 tons

Construction was said to have started at the end of 1876. Others say it started on 11 May 1877. When the ministers for the navy and the colonies visited the Koninklijke Fabriek in October 1877, substantial progress had been made. On 25 June 1878 Onrust Dock of 5,000 tons had been put together in Amsterdam. The Koninklijke Fabriek sent a model of the dry dock to the Paris Exposition Universelle (1878).

=== Assembly in Surabaya ===
On 16 October 1878 there was a tender for unloading, assembling, riveting and finishing Onrust Dock of 5,000 tons in the Dutch East Indies. The only offer received came from the Koninklijke Fabriek for 660,000 guilders. A similar tender in the Dutch East Indies failed, because no offers came in. The navy then decided to assemble it with its own staff, some brought over from the Netherlands.

The dry dock was transported in 8 shipments. On 10 June 1879 the first parts of the dock arrived in Surabaya. On 9 September 1879 SS Prins Hendrik arrived with parts of the dry dock., she had left Amsterdam on 19 July 1879. On 4 October 1879 the last shipment arrived.

On 14 June 1879 assembly started at Surabaya. On 18 October 1879 a series of photographs were taken. On 16 November 1879 the last plate was attached, and about one-third of the riveting was complete. By March 1880 the job was expected to be finished in 1.5 years. On 6 June 1880 Onrust Dock of 5,000 tons was launched by raising the water level in the dock pit where she was assembled. The dock had been assembled within a year. Therefore, the state shipyard at Surabaya claimed that it could compete with European commercial and state shipyards with respect to both cost and time.

== Characteristics ==
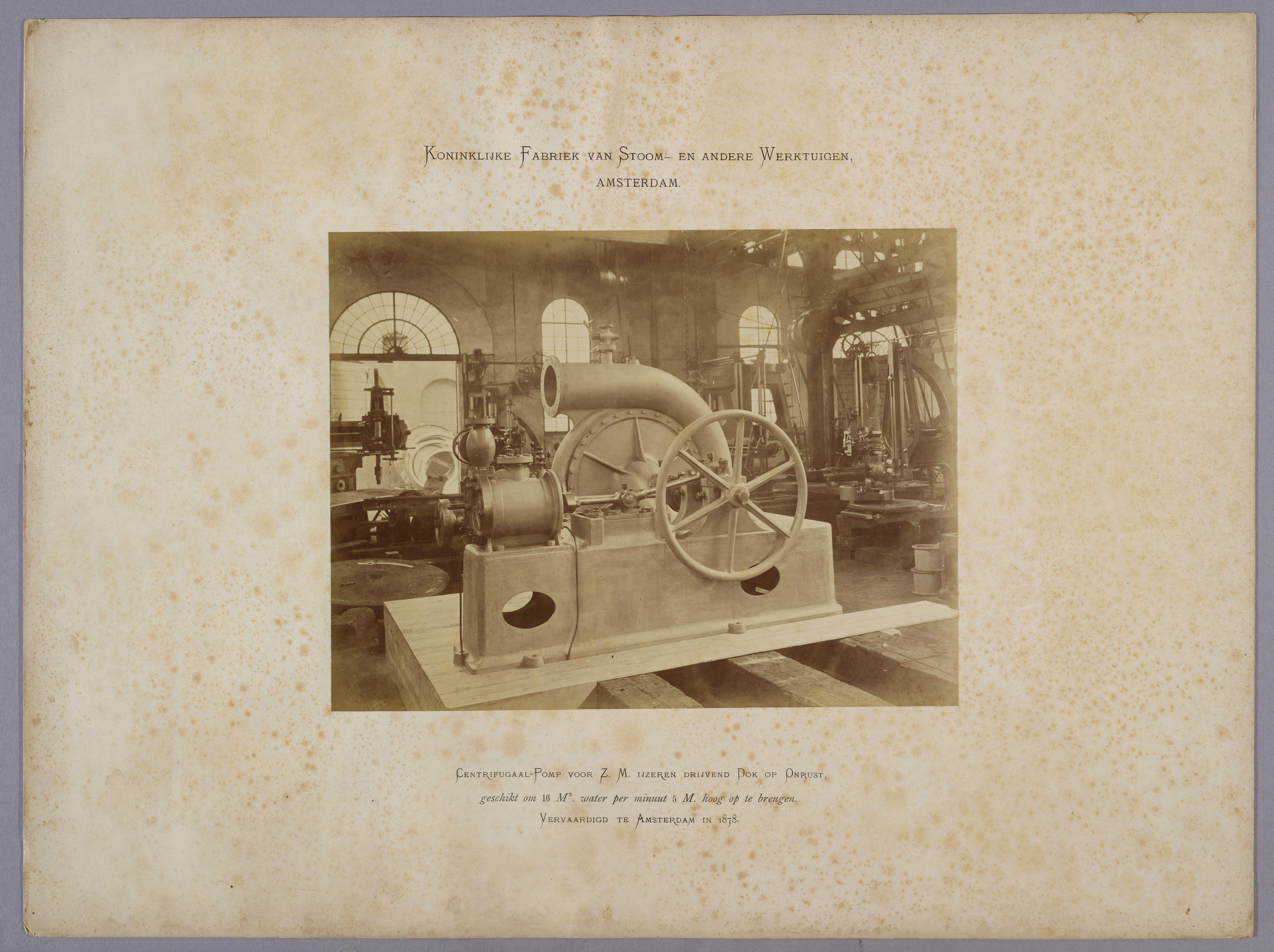
One of the pumps of Onrust Dock of 5,000 tons

Onrust Dock of 5,000 tons consisted of a big pontoon of 100 m long and 13.50 m wide. In the center the hold was 3.80 m and on the sides only 3.60 m, which increased strength. One longitudinal bulkhead and 14 transverse bulkheads divided her into water tight compartments. The longitudinal bulkhead was just below the blocks on which the keel of any ship using the dock would rest. The sides of the dock were 6.75 m wide at the floor and 2 m wide on the top. On the top the promenades were protected from the sun. They were connected by the 'bridges' that closed off the dock at both sides. In total about 2,760 tons of iron were used to construct the dock.

The dock could submerge till it had 6.30 m of water above the blocks. On the inner side of the dock each side had two heavy beams on a rack. These were used to position a ship exactly above the blocks where the keel should be. The ship would then be supported by two rows of tumble beams. (cf. the model)

The dock had four centrifugal pumps with a total capacity of 3,200 m^{3} water per hour. The engines were directly connected to the pumps. These had a 330 mm diameter cylinder with a stroke of 300 mm making 180 revolutions per minute. The boilers were of the Cornwallis system with Galloway pipes. The boilers had a 2 m diameter and were 9.50 m long, the steam pressure was 5 atm. In case of defects to a pump, the other pumps could take over its job.

== Service ==
=== At Onrust ===
On 23 October 1880, Onrust Dock of 5,000 tons arrived at Onrust Island from Surabaya and entered regular service for some time. In 1881 the dock serviced the 3,500t unprotected cruiser HNLMS Koningin Emma der Nederlanden, the Evertsen-class frigate Zeeland and the Watergeus. In January 1882 the ironclad HNLMS Prins Hendrik der Nederlanden was docked, one of the objectives of the construction of the dock. Apart from the bigger ships she also served small warships like the Siak and commercial vessels.

The 27 August 1883 eruption of Krakatoa caused two tsunamis that hit Onrust Island. Onrust Dock of 5,000 tons was secured in place by 16 iron chains. She was carrying the barque SS Augusta of Captain Hoffman. The tsunamis flooded most of the island and flattened many houses. The difference between the highest and lowest level of the water was 4 meters. Koningin Emma der Nederlanden was beaten off her moorings, but stayed safe. The tsunami broke the chains between Onrust Dock of 5,000 tons and her dolphins, and the chains of most of her anchors. The few remaining anchors did not hold, and so the dock drifted. It hit and severely damaged the Siak on the quay. All ropes that were connected to the dock broke, and it took until 18:30 that the dock was secured again. From Onrust Island Volharding Dock was seen floating. Later Onrust Dock of 5,000 tons was found only lightly damaged. In November 1883 the Spanish cruiser Gravina used the dock.

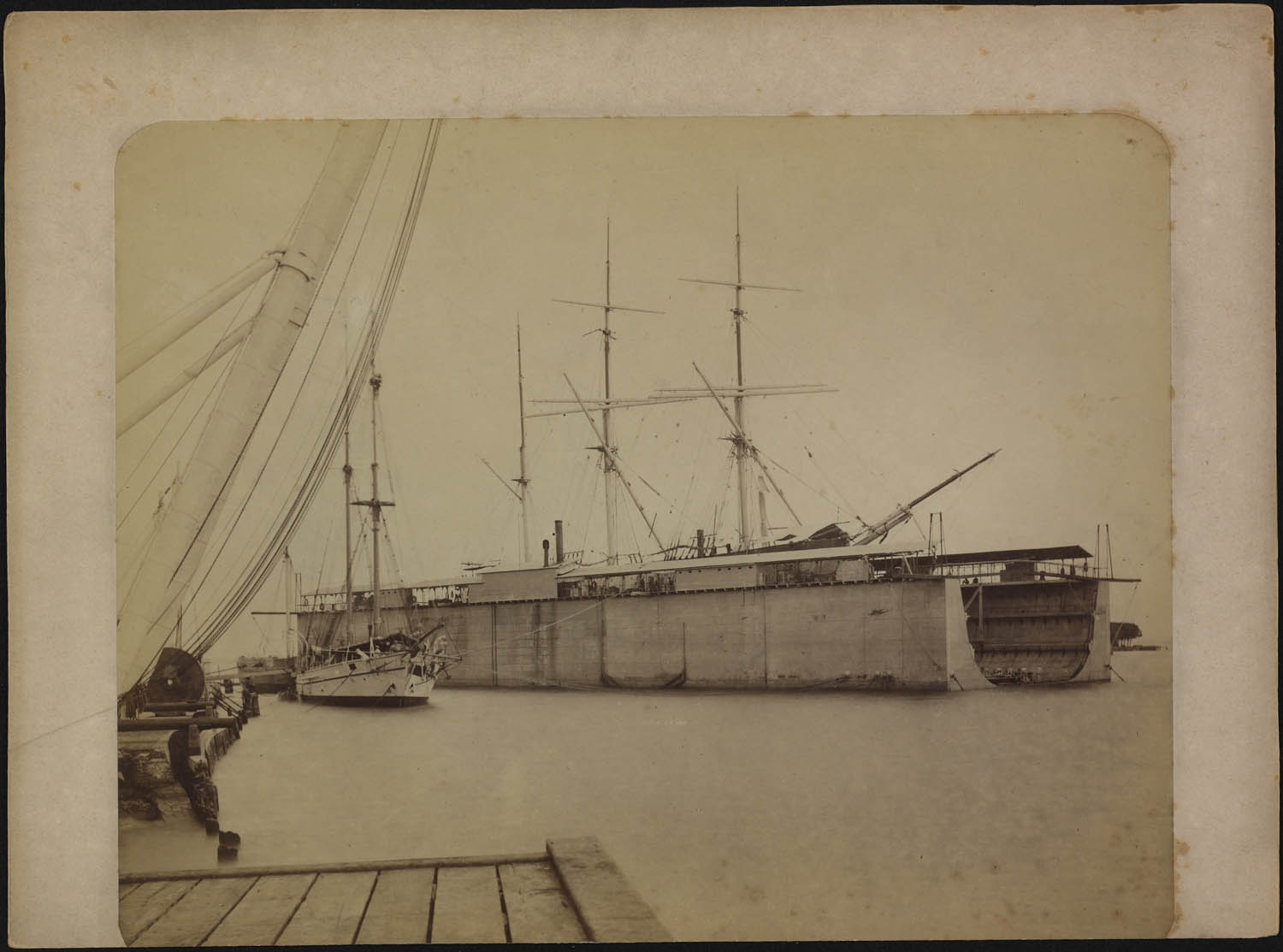
Kosmopoliet III in Onrust Dock c. January 1885

In November 1883, HNLMS Koning der Nederlanden was reported to be serviced by Onrust Dock of 5,000 tons before moving on to Surabaya. On 5 September 1884 the Koning der Nederlanden was again reported to being serviced by the dock. On 18 January 1884 HNLMS Atjeh was lifted by Onrust Dock of 5,000 tons. When she had been lifted 1.5 m Atjeh suddenly collapsed to port. No significant damage was reported, but dockmaster Duyvetter was transferred to Surabaya, due to his inexperience causing irregularities in the operation of the dock. In February 1884 the American ship Evie Reed used the dock. In December 1884 or January 1885 the Barque Kosmopoliet III of 3,924 m^{3} capacity was in the dock to get her copper skin repaired. By 20 January 1885 these repairs were finished.

In April 1885 the Prins Hendrik was in Onrust Dock of 5,000 tons when the Russian armored cruiser Minin of 6,234t arrived at Onrust Island after being rejected from docking in Singapore. Minin had a draft of 26 feet, which, in May, it tried to lessen to 23.5 feet by unloading her guns, ammunition, sailing equipment and the like. In June the Minin continued to occupy the dock while Koningin Emma der Nederlanden sat nearby waiting to dock. In December 1885 a Russian squadron consisting of Russian cruiser Vladimir Monomakh, and the smaller Oprichnik and Razboinik visited Batavia. Razboinik visited the Onrust dock to repair a leak under the waterline.

After the harbor of Tanjung Priok was placed back into service, the Dutch government had less reason to maintain a naval base at Onrust, leading to its closing. Onrust Dock of 5,000 tons was closed on 16 February 1886. On 1 April 1886 HNLMS Banca, HNLMS Merapi, and the hopper barges Rambang and Soerabaja began to tow the dock from Onrust to Surabaya.

=== At Surabaya ===
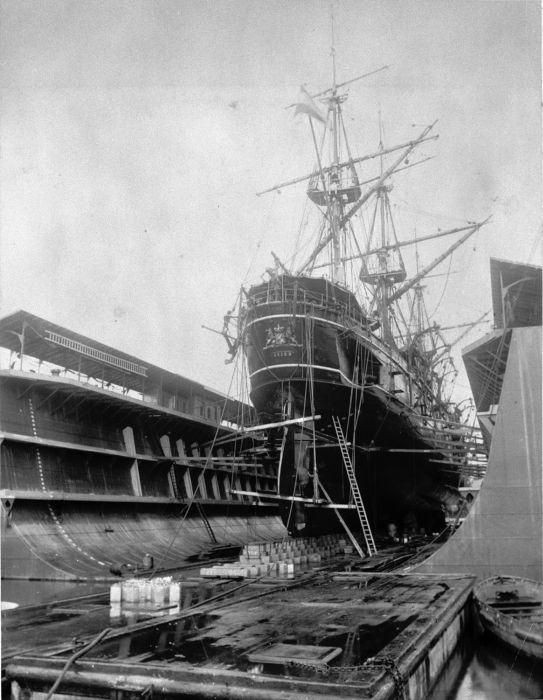
Unprotected Cruiser Atjeh in the Dock at Surabaya

Onrust Dock of 5,000 tons arrived in Surabaya on 12 April 1886. In early May she had been brought into the dock pit and by June 1886 had been put on the blocks in order to be repaired. The repairs were so extensive that Surabaya's dock pit would not be available to assemble the Surabaya Dock of 1,400 tons until the second half of 1887.

In May 1887 Onrust Dock of 5,000 tons was commissioned again. In February 1888 HNLMS Ceram docked in Onrust Dock of 5,000 tons. In May 1888 HNLMS van Speyk used the dock. On 13 June 1888 Onrust Dock of 5,000 tons was said to be being repaired. On 3 August 1888 the dock was pronounced ready for service. On 14 August HNLMS Prins Hendrik arrived to use the dock. In the first quarter of 1889 HNLMS Koning der Nederlanden was docked in Surabaya. Eight more warships and the SS Prins Alexander of the SMN also docked in Surabaya, however it is not known which dock each ship used. In July 1889 HNLMS Sindoro used the dock. In September 1889 HNLMS Merapi. In July 1890 HNLMS van Speijk was to go to Surabaya to dock and to get new boilers. This probably started the months long repair from which she returned only in early 1891. Otherwise the Surabaya docks were very quiet, due to most of the fleet being engaged against Aceh, and docking primarily near Singapore and Penang.

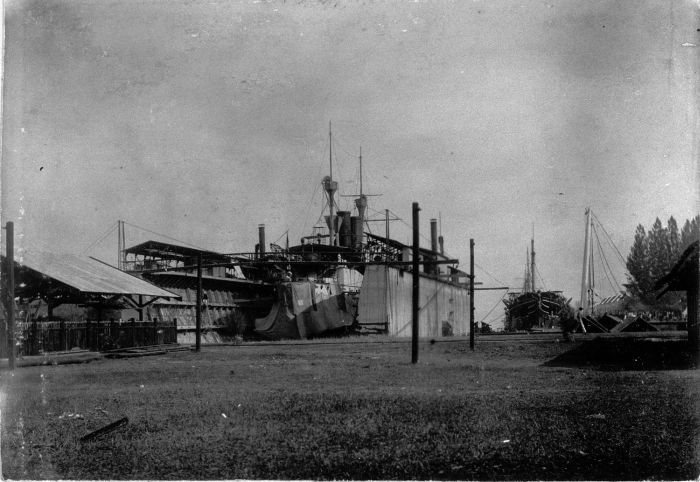
Protected Cruiser Sumatra on the Dock at Surabaya

On 15 October 1891 the 3,000 tons dock left Surabaya for Tanjung Priok, and she would not return before November 1896. Onrust Dock of 5,000 tons was left in Surabaya with the new small iron dock of 1,400 tons. During the Aceh Wars, the Dutch docking policy was that small repairs and maintenance could be done in the British harbors of Penang and Singapore, but all major repairs should be done in Surabaya. The period started with small repairs of the dock itself in the dock pit. The dock then served Prins Hendrik der Nederlanden, in March 1892 HNLMS Atjeh, in April HNLMS Koningin Emma der Nederlanden. Many smaller ships also docked in Surabaya, but it is unknown which dock they used. From the 1st October 1892 to the 1st October 1893 the exact use of both docks was published. Onrust Dock of 5,000 tons serviced the usual heavy units (including the protected cruiser Sumatra), but also the gunvessel HNLMS Bali, which would later use the 1,400 tons dock. The following year, the dock was used by 51 ships for 501 days. This number of days was caused by a ship leaving the dock, and another ship entering the same day, and also by multiple (small) vessels being in the dock at the same time. In 1894-1895 this figure was 37 vessels for 419 days. One of these was HNLMS Koningin Wilhelmina der Nederlanden of 4,530 tons. In early 1896 the docks became less busy, with the 5,000 tons dock servicing 37 ships for 280 days in 1895–1896. In November 1896 the 3,000 ton dock returned to Surabaya, but she would she did not service any ships in 1896–1897. The 5,000 tons dock serviced 50 ships for 258 days. In the next period she serviced 4 ships for 20 days.

The Onrust Dock of 5,000 tons was decommissioned for a major overhaul on the 19th of October 1897. By June 1898 over 300 people were working on renovating the dry dock. The works were led by engineer De Heer, and also entailed the replacement of multiple bad metal sheets. To cover for the absence of the 5,000 ton dock, the 3,000 tons dock served in Surabaya from 14 February 1898 - 18 March 1898, before it left for Sabang. On 20 May 1899, after leaving the dock pit Onrust Dock of 5,000 tons was recommissioned again.

Up to 30 September 1899 she then serviced 39 ships for 218 days. From 20 to 24 May 1899 she serviced the protected cruiser Friesland and from 14 to 20 July 1899 the protected cruiser Holland. Next she serviced the armored cruiser Piet Hein till 10 August 1899. From 10 to 16 May 1903 HNLMS Koningin Regentes of 5,002 tons docked in Singapore. This was no coincidence, in January 1905 the 5,000 tons dock tried to lift Koningin Regentes, but could not lift her further than 1 m above the bottom of the keel. This was bad news for the Dutch navy and the dock and meant that the new standard 'heavy' warships of the Dutch navy could not be docked completely in Surabaya. Nevertheless, the 5,000 tons dock continued to service these ships. From 4–9 April 1910 Onrust Dock of 5,000 tons lifted De Ruyter In November 1910 Koningin Regentes docked in Surabaya, followed by De Ruyter and Hertog Hendrik. The docking of De Ruyter was made possible by unloading her as far as possible, bringing her weight of 5,084 tons back by about 1,000 tons. This expedient evaded the frequent and costly dockings in Singapore. However the unloading strategy did not seem feasible on larger ships such as in the case of De Zeven Provinciën (6,530 tons).

Just before World War I, in November 1913, the new Surabaya Dock of 14,000 tons arrived at Surabaya. It was meant for the Droogdok Maatschappij Tandjong Priok, but the Dutch government changed its mind and handed it to the Naval Base at Surabaya. Onrust Dock of 5,000 tons was moved from her usual place, the bottom of the harbor was dredged out to 15 m, and the new 14,000 tons dock was moved into place in early 1915. Little was done with the dock until a contract for use was made with the Droogdok Maatschappij Soerabaja in November 1915. On 29 March 1916 the new dock was then moved to the new harbor of Surabaya. De Zeven Provinciën was claimed to have docked at the naval base in Surabaya on 28–29 February 1916. She was docked in the bigger dock of the Droogdok Maatschappij Surabaya 5–11 December 1916, 14–18 June 1917, and 25–27 March 1918, At the same time the smaller ships like Koningin Regentes and De Ruyter seem to have continued to use Onrust Dock of 5,000 tons, but even this is doubtful because a year later they were stated to have used the 14,000 tons dock.

=== Decommissioning ===
In July 1924 the Hollandsche Aanneming Mij started to poor concrete for a new 80 m long dock. It came on the spot where Onrust Dock of 5,000 tons was situated, and subsequently the 5,000 tons dock was decommissioned and declared unsuitable. In August 1925 an advertisement offered Onrust Dock of 5,000 tons on condition of breaking her up. In January 1926 Onrust Dock of 5,000 tons was lying on the Madoerawal in Surabaya. She was sold to Wijnschenk for 2,700 guilders.
