= HNLMS Atjeh =

Atjeh-class unprotected cruiser

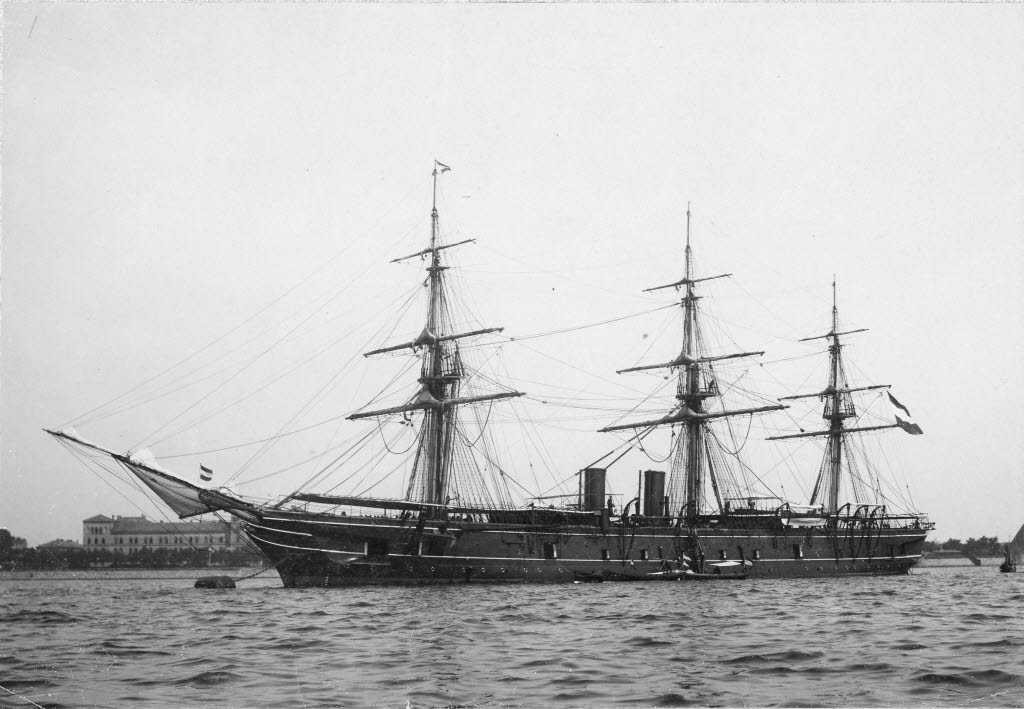
- Atjeh at Kiel 1895

History

Netherlands
- Name: Atjeh
- Namesake: Aceh
- Builder: Rijkswerf, Amsterdam
- Laid down: 3 March 1875
- Launched: 6 November 1876
- Commissioned: 1 November 1877
- Decommissioned: 1921

General characteristics (as completed)
- Class & type: Atjeh-class
- Displacement: 3,160 tons
- Length: 93.05 m (305 ft 3 in) (overall); 80.00 m (262 ft 6 in) (p/p)
- Beam: 12.497 m (41 ft 0 in)
- Draft: 6.706 m (22 ft 0 in)
- Installed power: Compound steam engine; nominal 370 kW (500 hp); effective 2,200 kW (3,000 ihp)
- Speed: 14 knots (26 km/h)
- Complement: 225
- Armament: 6 × 6.7 in (17 cm) (6 × 1); 8 × 4.7 in (12 cm) (8 × 1)
- Armour: engine behind coal bunkers

HNLMS Atjeh (Dutch: Zr.Ms/Hr.Ms. Atjeh), was an Atjeh-class unprotected cruiser built at the Rijkswerf Amsterdam for the Royal Netherlands Navy. The ship served three term in the Dutch East Indies and was rebuilt as accommodation ship in 1906.

== Service history ==
Atjeh was laid down at the Rijkswerf in Amsterdam on 3 March 1875. She was launched on 6 November 1876. The ship was commissioned on 1 November 1877. Later, the ship had to undergo speed trials at Texel where she reached 14,5 knots. On 1 June 1878 the ship left the port of Nieuwediep for a cruise in the North Atlantic Ocean, but while just underway her topmasts broke and she had to return to port for repairs. After repairs where completed Atjeh returned to Texel roadstead on 12 June. On 20 July 1878 she visited Leith, Scotland and left there on 26 July for a trip along the Dutch coast turning around at Scheveningen and returning to Texel on 1 August. 15 August 1878 she was decommissioned. Atjeh was recommissioned on 1 October 1879.

=== East Indies 1880-1884 ===
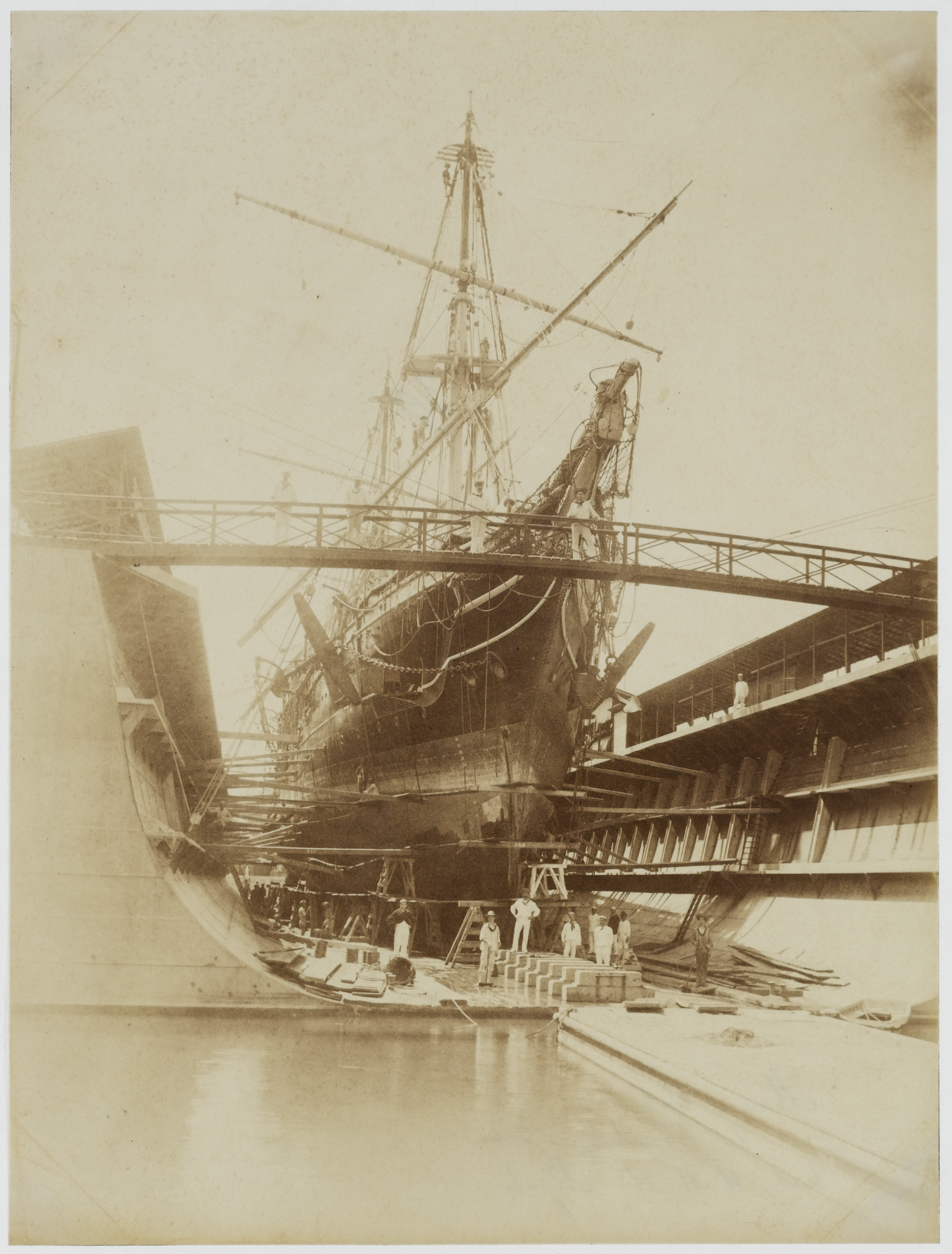
Atjeh on Onrust Dock of 5,000 tons

In late 1879, Atjeh left the Netherlands for the Dutch East Indies. Her first destination was Cowes on the Isle of Wight, where she arrived on 2 November. Here J.S. White was building 6 steam launches for the Dutch Navy. Three steam launches were 30 feet long, and three others 25 feet long. The biggest made 7.5 knots, the smaller type 6.8 knots. Each type could easily tow 4-5 other boats. On 5 November, the crew of Atjeh tested the first of the big steam launches, which she took on board on the 7th. On 28 January 1880 Atjeh reached Cape of Good Hope. On 10 February she left there for Batavia, where she arrived on 27 March 1880.

In Batavia Atjeh became part of the Auxiliary squadron replacing Curaçao. Some repairs were made, and Atjeh docked at Onrust At the time, the dry dock at Onrust was Onrust Dock of 3,000 tons. The statement about docking at Onrust therefore seems a bit unlikely. However, in April 1881 her captain would indeed write that she had not docked in a small year and that she showed a typical characteristic of zinc plated ships. I.e. she was almost clean when she docked after arriving from the Netherlands, but was very dirty after one year sailing in the tropics.

On 15 May Atjeh and Macassar then left on a trip to Northern Borneo, the Philippines, the Solok archipelago and Makassar. During this trip Atjeh made good use of the steam launch. She arrived back Surabaya on 19 August 1880.

On 3 September 1880 Atjeh left Surabaya for a trip to Australia. After visiting Timor she returned to Batavia on 13 January 1881. In March 1881 Atjeh was lifted by Onrust Dock of 5,000 tons. This dry dock first arrived at Onrust on 23 October 1880.

In early May 1881 Atjeh left for Surabaya. From 10 to 12 June she performed the yearly measurement of the shoal at the mouth of the Solo River. Returning to Batavia late June. From 4 September till 1 October she made a trip to the Riau Archipelago, Lingga Archipelago and East coast of Sumatra for practice and showing the flag. During the first half of October she was sent to Muntok due to the outbreak of cholera on Java where she stayed over a month. In the second half of November she made a trip along the North and East coast of Aceh. In late December she was tasked with finding survivors of the shipwrecked SS Koning der Nederlanden in the Indian Ocean. She returned from this in February 1882 to Batavia.

In June 1882 Atjeh made a trip to Aceh from which she returned on 26 January 1883. From 15 April till November 1883 she was in Aceh, from whence she returned on 9 November. She then proceeded to Onrust to prepare for her return to Europe. The ship left Batavia for the Netherlands on 21 February 1884.

=== Europe, Africa and the West Indies 1884-1889 ===
Atjeh arrived at Texel on 24 June 1884. In the autumn of 1884 she made a trip to the Atlantic Ocean for practice and a trip to the West coast of Africa. The ship left Texel on 16 November 1884 and visited among others Tenerife, Freetown and Monrovia. At Futila, Angola she set ashore a landing party to help put down a rebellion of locals against a Dutch factory there. On the journey back she stopped at Lisbon for provisions, docked at Ferrol and visited Portsmouth. 2 June 1885 she arrived back at Texel.

Atjeh left Texel for the West Indies on 18 November 1885 and arrived on 30 December at Curaçao, where she replaced Bonaire as station ship. In February 1886 Atjeh visited Colon and in April Trinidad, Grenada, Saint Vincent, Saint Lucia, Saint Martin, Sint Eustatius and Saba. In November and December 1886 the ship made trips to Colombia and Santo Domingo to show the flag. On 13 February 1887 she was relieved as station ship by Koningin Emma der Nederlanden.

Atjeh left Curaçao for the Netherlands on 15 February 1887 and arrived on 27 March at Texel. Later in 1887 and throughout 1888 Atjeh was at Willemsoord, Den Helder for major maintenance. She was not recommissioned until 5 January 1889. Among the things done where the instalment of new boilers.

On 2 July 1889 Atjeh left Texel and was joined by Tromp for exrecises on the North Sea. Afterwards, they were in Oslo from 31 July till 6 August. Both ships returned to Texel on 20 August. On 6 October 1889 Atjeh joined Tromp and Van Galen forming a division for foreign service, for practice on the Atlantic Ocean. On 10 October 1889 the three ships left Texel and stayed from 2 till 7 November at Saint Vincent and from 29 November till 9 December at Rio de Janeiro. After this the division was disbanded and Atjeh went on to the East Indies.

=== East Indies 1890-1893 ===
Atjeh arrived in Batavia on 31 January 1890. Here she relieved De Ruyter, but had to leave on 24 February for a trip to the Persian Gulf from whence she left in late April, steaming to Bombay and then to Aceh. Atjeh arrived in Olehleh, Ache on 31 May 1890 where she replaced Van Speyk at the naval force stationed at the North coast of Aceh. From 6 till 24 February she was in Singapore to dock and then proceeded to Batavia. Then end of March she was back at Aceh. Where she joined the naval force stationed at the North coast of Aceh on 20 March 1891 till 14 March 1892. 13 March she arrived in Batavia from witch she left on 16 March to make a trip to Surabaya. At Surabaya she received some maintenance.

From 15 April till 28 May 1982 Atjeh cruised the waters around Bali and Lombok. After that she was until 29 June present at Ampenan, Lombok to survey the shipping in that area. From there she left for Makassar, Celebes where she arrived on 1 July. She stayed there until 7 July to leave again for the waters around Bali and Lombok. 21 August she was back at Makassar where she stayed until 11 October. When she left again for service in the waters around Bali and Lombok, which lasted until 16 November. On 16 December she visited Surabaya where she received some maintenance. From there she again left for service in the waters around Bali and Lombok. From 18 January till 1 February 1893 Atjeh was at Surabaya. After that she served until 21 March in the waters of Bali and Lombok and from there steamed to Batavia. On 29 April 1893 she left for Makassar where she stayed from 3 till 7 May. After that she was until 28 May present at Ampenan, Lombok to survey the shipping in that area. From here she left for Surabaya where she arrived on 30 May, staying until 14 June. Then she returned to the waters around Bali and Lombok where she served until 27 July. After that she went to Surabaya to prepare here for the journey back to Europe. From there she steamed to Tanjung Priok where she arrived on 27 August. On 28 September 1893 she left Tanjung Priok for the Netherlands.

=== Europe 1894-1895 ===
Atjeh arrived in Vlissingen on 11 January 1894. Atjeh and Alkmaar represented the Dutch government at the opening of the Kiel Canal in June 1895.

=== East Indies 1895-1899 ===
Atjeh again left Vlissingen for the East Indies on 5 September 1895, where she was to replace Koningin Emma der Nederlanden in the Auxiliary squadron. She arrived at Tanjung Priok on 27 December 1895. She left Tanjung Priok on 12 January 1896 and became part of the naval force stationed at the east of Java and Borneo on 15 January. On this day she departed from Ampenan, Lombok to Makassar, Celebes. In March and April that year she made a trip along the West and East coast of Celebes and from there to Ternate, Ambon, Banda Islands and back to Makassar.

From 10 to 24 June 1896 Atjeh was at Surabaya to dock. After that she made a trip to the Lesser Sunda Islands until 24 July and spend a few days at Kupang. In August she disciplined the kampong Kadjoemaloeè on the West coast of Celebes. Early March 1897 she was a few days at Tanjung Priok to exchange part of her crew with Van Speyk, who had arrived in the Indies in February from Netherlands and left again for Europe on 3 March. In July 1897 Atjeh made a trip to Gorontalo, Kema, Ternate and the West coast of Celebes. In November she visited Badung, Bali and from 15 till 30 March she visited Tanjung Priok. Next she left for Surabaya where she arrived at 1 April to move the 3,000 tons Dock to the bay of Sabang, Ache. At Ache she was temporarily attached to the naval force stationed there. 15 September 1898 she left for Surabaya to prepare here for the journey back to the Netherlands. In late January 1899 she left Surabaya and steamed to Singapore and then to Olehleh. 27 March 1899 she left for the Netherlands steaming around the Cape of Good Hope. Where she stayed from 11 till 23 May 1899 at Cape Town and arrived 14 August 1899 at Texel.

=== Later career ===
In 1906 Atjeh was rebuilt as accommodation ship and commissioned as such on 8 November that year at the naval base Willemsoord, Den Helder. The ship was decommissioned in 1921.
