= HNLMS Tromp =

At least eight ships of the Royal Netherlands Navy have been named HNLMS Tromp after Admiral Maarten Tromp (1598–1653), or his son Cornelis Tromp (1629–1691):

- Dutch ship Tromp (1777), fourth-rate ship of the line
- HNLMS Admiraal C. Tromp, a 7-gun armed schooner, which served from 1809-1826.
- HNLMS Tromp, a 64/68 gun ship of the line launched in 1808, and sold in 1820.
- HNLMS Tromp, a 74-gun ship of the line laid down in 1830, but not completed until 1850, struck in 1867, and sold for scrap in 1872.
- HNLMS Tromp (1877), was an Atjeh-class unprotected cruiser.
- HNLMS Maarten Harpertszoon Tromp (1904)
- HNLMS Tromp (1937), launched in 1937, was a Tromp-class light cruiser that served in World War II.
- HNLMS Tromp (F801), launched in 1973, was the lead ship of her class of guided missile frigates.
- HNLMS Tromp (F803), second of the De Zeven Provinciën-class frigates, entered service in 2003.
