= HNLMS Van Speijk =

Eight ships of the Royal Netherlands Navy have been named HNLMS Van Speijk (also spelled Speyk), after Jan van Speijk:

- HNLMS Van Speijk (1832), ex Argo, corvette;
- HNLMS Van Speijk (1842), ex Medusa, corvette;
- HNLMS Van Speyk (1882), an Atjeh-class unprotected cruiser
- HNLMS Van Speijk (K3), shore bombardment/escort ship;
- HNLMS Van Speijk (1960), auxiliary ship (ex Flores);
- HNLMS Van Speijk (F802), was the lead ship of her class of frigates.
- HNLMS Van Speijk (1986), experimental ship for testing with new fuel. Ex HNLMS Dokkum, a Van Stralen-class minesweeper;
- HNLMS Van Speijk (F828), launched in 1994, is a Karel Doorman-class frigate.
