= Greek ironclad Vasilissa Olga =

Ironclad warship of the Greek Navy

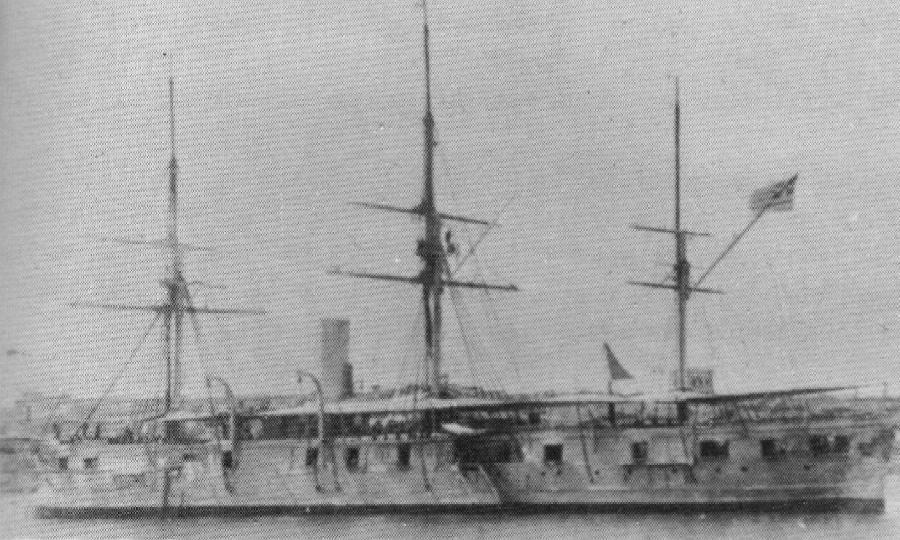
- Vasilissa Olga - Βασίλισσα Όλγα

History

Greece
- Name: Vasilissa Olga
- Namesake: Queen Olga
- Ordered: 1868
- Builder: Stabilimento Tecnico Triestino, Trieste
- Laid down: 1868
- Launched: 1869
- Commissioned: 1871
- Fate: Scrapped, 1925

General characteristics (as built)
- Type: Armored corvette
- Displacement: 2,030 long tons (2,060 t)
- Length: 294 ft 4 in (89.7 m)
- Beam: 39 ft (11.9 m)
- Draft: 19 ft (5.8 m)
- Installed power: 1,950 ihp (1,450 kW)
- Propulsion: 1 shaft, 1 steam engine
- Sail plan: Barque rigged
- Speed: 10 knots (19 km/h; 12 mph)
- Armament: 2 × 9-inch (228.6 mm) rifled muzzle-loading guns; 10 × 70-pdr rifled muzzle-loading guns
- Armor: Belt: 3.9–5.9 in (99–150 mm); Battery: 4.7 in (120 mm); Bulkheads: 4.7 in (120 mm)

The Greek ironclad Vasilissa Olga (Greek: Βασίλισσα Όλγα) was purchased from Chile for the Royal Hellenic Navy in 1868. She was converted into a training ship in 1897 and scrapped in 1925.

== Design and description ==
Vasilissa Olga's design was derived from that of the Austro-Hungarian broadside ironclads of the Kaiser Max class. The ship had a length overall of 249 feet 4 inches (76.0 m) long, a beam of 39 feet (11.9 m) and a draft of 22 feet 8 inches (6.9 m) at deep load. The ship displaced 2,030 long tons (2,060 t) and was fitted with a single steam engine that drove one propeller. The engine was rated at 1,950 indicated horsepower (1,450 kW) which gave her a speed of 10 knots (19 km/h; 12 mph). For long-distance travel, Vasilissa Olga was fitted with three masts and was barque rigged. She carried 240 long tons (240 t) of coal.

The ironclad was originally armed with a pair of 9-inch (229 mm) guns and ten 70-pounders, all of which were Armstrong rifled muzzle-loading guns. Later, she had four 17 cm RK L/25, two 17 cm RK L/20, four machine guns and four very small guns.

Vasilissa Olga had a complete waterline armor belt that was 5.9 in (150 mm) thick amidships and reduced to 3.9 in (99 mm) at her ends. Above the belt amidships was an armored citadel that was protected by 4.7-inch (119 mm) plates on all four sides.

== Construction and service ==
Vasilissa Olga, named for Queen Olga of Greece, was originally ordered by Chile from the Austro-Hungarian shipbuilder Stabilimento Tecnico Triestino, but Greece took over the contract in December 1868. The ship was laid down in 1868, launched in 1869 and completed in 1871. She was rearmed in 1880 and was converted into a gunnery training ship in 1897. During this conversion, Vasilissa Olga was re-engined and her sailing rig was replaced by two military masts. She was scrapped in 1925.
