= 12 cm K.A. =

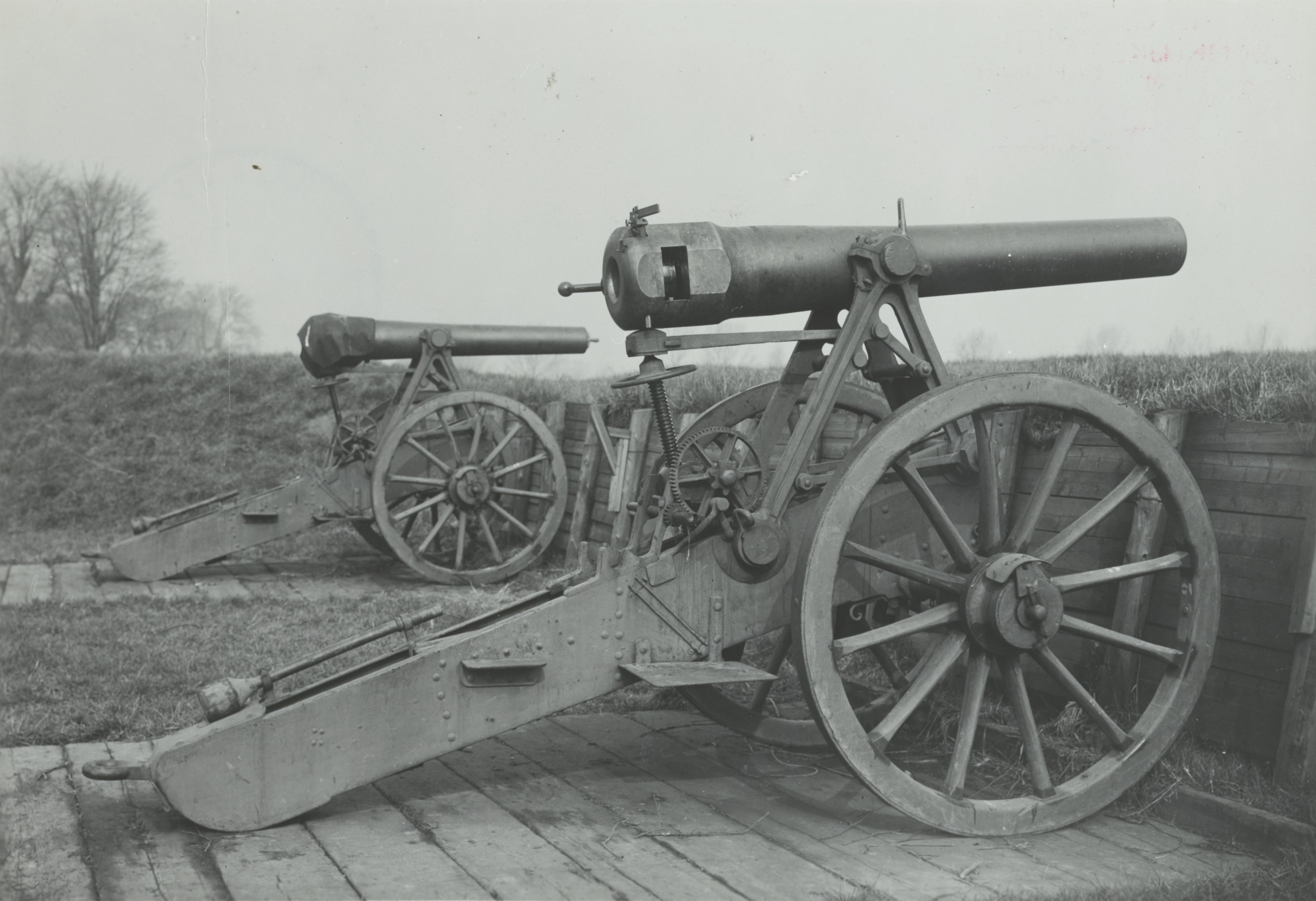
- Two 12 cm K.A. in 1920
- Type: Gun-howitzer, Naval gun
- Place of origin: Netherlands

Service history
- In service: Army 1873; Navy 1875 - 1881
- Used by: Royal Netherlands Army; Royal Netherlands Navy

Production history
- Unit cost: 3,825 guilders
- Produced: 1873
- No. built: 570+

Specifications
- Mass: 942 kg
- Length: 2.10 m
- Caliber: 12-centimetre (4.72 in)
- Muzzle velocity: 293.4 m at 41 m

The 12 cm K.A. was a Dutch fortress, siege and naval rifled bronze breechloading gun. In the Dutch army it was called Kanon Brons getrokken van 12 cm K.A.. In the Dutch navy: Kanon van 12 cm A No. 2. It was produced in substantial numbers in the Netherlands. There were also steel and steel bronze versions.

== Context ==
=== The name 12 cm K.A. ===
The army most often designated this gun as: 'Kanon van 12 cm K.A.'. It was a short bronze breechloading gun meant for indirect fire. K.A. stood for Kort (short) and Achterlader (breechloader). That the gun was made of bronze, was not mentioned, because all army short 12 cm breechloaders were made of bronze. The label 'short' stood for the relatively short barrel, but also that the gun was meant for indirect fire. In the army, there were also Long 12 cm guns, designated L. or Lang. These also carried a label 'bronze' or 'steel'. The navy also had a steel version of the 12 cm K.A., but kept them apart by using numbers.

=== Procurement ===
In early 1870 the Dutch field artillery was very backward. In March 1871 the Minister for Defense therefore sent two artillery officers to Switzerland to study a new bronze breech loading field gun of 84 mm caliber. These officers bought a gun (the 8.4 cm Feldgeschütz Ord 1871) and 500 shot in Winterthur. In early 1872 the gun arrived and was successfully tested against the Dutch 8 cm rifled muzzle loader. Judging by its appearance the 12 cm A No. 2 gun seems to have been modeled on the 8.4 cm gun.

== Development and production ==
=== Development of the 12 cm K.A. ===
The 12 cm gun appeared rather unexpectedly. In 1872 the Minister for War was busy modernizing the rifles. For artillery he had a 24 cm gun in production, and he planned to construct 25 15 cm guns in 1873. The only mention of a 12 cm gun, was that it would cost about 3,000 guilders. The House of Representatives then urged the minister to procure breechloader field guns. In July 1873 the minister of Defense then suddenly approved the 12 cm gun short.

=== Steel Bronze ===
While the ministry was planning the bronze breechloaders, there were heavy doubts about the suitability of bronze for guns of medium caliber. In 1874 the Austrian army then held successful trials with a new gun presented by Franz von Uchatius. Uchatius copied an autofrettage (avant la lettre) process from a 1869 American patent without a license and marketed it as steel bronze (staalhard brons). It was an alloy of 92% copper and 8% tin, which was made tougher by chilling and pressing it. Chilling was done by casting the bronze in an iron form which quickly chilled of the bronze. Later the gun was 'pressed' to eliminate the widening that would normally be created by firing the first shots. For the Dutch, concerns about cost and strategic vulnerability were reason enough to switch to producing steel bronze guns according to this procedure in about 1880, even despite that was obvious that steel bronze guns are inferior compared to cast steel.

=== Production for the army ===
In 1871 the gun foundry Maritz Company in The Hague came under control of the War Office. It would then become known as Rijks Geschutgieterij (national gun foundry). This state company would have to produce the bulk of the 12 cm K.A.'s In September 1873 there were plans to produce 20 12 cm K.A. for the army in 1874, while 400 were thought to be required. In December 1873 it became known that this was due to a capacity problem at the Rijks Geschutgieterij.

In 1874 the army requirements for the 12 cm K.A. were estimated at 465 guns, excluding those for the Stelling van Amsterdam. At the same time 210 long 12 cm guns were deemed to be required. It was planned to produce 150 12 cm K.A. in 1875. Planning for 1876 was to produce 100 12 cm K.A. at 3,825 guilders a piece. On 1 January 1880 there were 379 army 12 cm K.A. available, while 526 were thought to be required.

By late 1879 the Rijks Geschutgieterij had been equipped to produce steel bronze guns. By then, the bronze 12 cm K.A. was not a priority. Instead an attempt was made to produce a steel bronze 84 mm field gun, which was urgently required. When this failed these guns were bought from Krupp. The Rijks Geschutgieterij then spent the rest of 1880 casting 60 steel bronze 12 cm Long.

=== Production for the navy ===
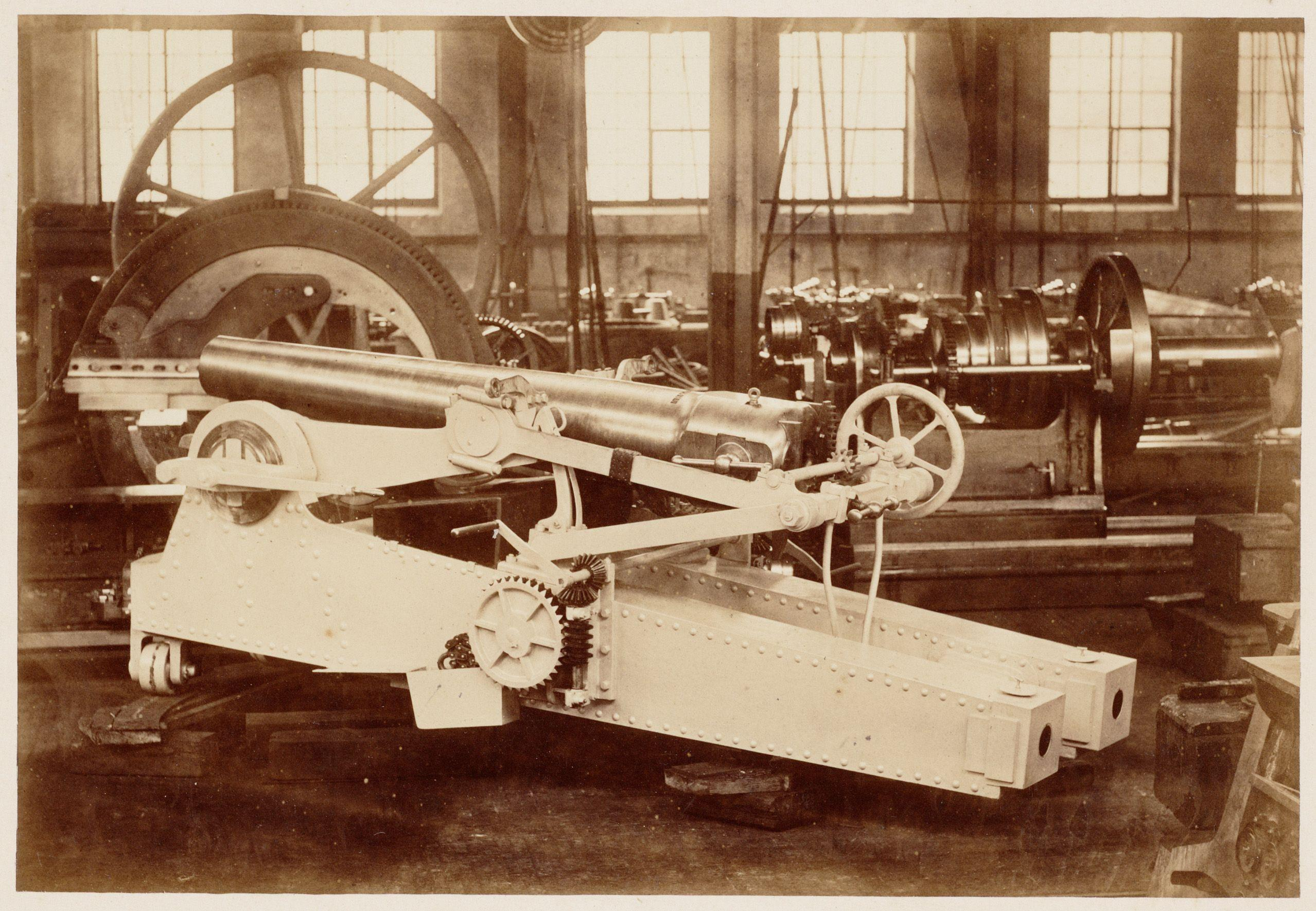
A 12 cm A No. 2 getting finished at Koninklijke Fabriek van Stoom- en andere Werktuigen

In 1876 there was a list of newly approved guns for the Dutch navy. It stated that there were / would be three kinds of 12 cm short guns in the navy:

- 12 cm A No. 1 was the steel version made by Krupp. It was 2.1 m long overall and weighed 800 kg.
- 12 cm A No. 2 was cast by the gun foundry at the Rijkswerf Amsterdam, and probably at the Rijks Geschutgieterij in The Hague before that. The guns were finished by the Koninklijke Fabriek van Stoom- en andere werktuigen. It was made of bronze and generally resembled the army gun in dimensions and looks. The breech and inside of the gun resembled No. 1.
- 12 cm A No. 3 was made by the Rijks Geschutgieterij in The Hague. It was exactly the same as the army 12 cm K.A. It resembled No. 1 in dimensions and grooves, was made of bronze and weighed 910 kg.

Until late 1875 the Rijks Geschutgieterij had cast bronze guns for the navy. The navy then founded its own gun foundry at Rijkswerf Amsterdam, because the Minister for War did not want to produce guns for the navy due to capacity problems. In June 1877 the navy gun foundry started to operate. It cast guns designated as No. 2. This casts some doubt about whether the Koninklijke Fabriek van Stoom- en andere werktuigen really finished guns founded by Rijks Geschutgieterij, or whether this applied to guns cast in Amsterdam from the start. In total about 43 regular 12 cm K.A. No. 2 were cast by the Rijkswerf, and 58 steel hard 12 cm K.A. No. 2 were cast by the Rijkswerf.

The production history of the 12 cm K.A. No. 2 at the Rijkswerf is well known. By 31 December 1877 19 barrels for the 12 cm K.A. No. 2 had been produced. In 1878 24 guns were cast. In 1879 no 12 cm guns were cast. In 1880 17 guns were cast. This time the guns were made of steel bronze. In 1881 9 guns were cast. In 1882 13 guns were cast. In 1883 4 guns were cast, but one of the guns from stock was rejected before getting finished. In 1884 7 guns were cast. In 1885 6 guns were cast. In 1886 only one 12 cm gun was cast. In 1889 the two last 12 cm K.A. No. 2 were cast.

== Characteristics ==
The 12 cm gun was made of bronze. It had a breech with a Broadwell Ring. The barrel had twelve grooves of 0.15 cm depth.

The gun was 2.10 m long, and weighed 910 kg. The first carriage had been made from that of the 15 cm howitzer, and weighed 635 kg.

== Ammunition ==
The first ammunition consisted of ring shells (grenades) and canister shot. The grenade was covered with lead on the outside. It had three grooves wound with rope, to keep the barrel clean. The explosive charge was 0.59-0.60 kg. The weight of the filled grenade was 13.6 kg. It was ignited by a percussion fuze of Swiss model. The grenade was fired with a charge of 0.5 or 1.1 kg.

The canister shot had a sheet metal hull. It was 21.5 cm long and weighed 11.5 kg. On 11.4 cm from the bottom it had a lead ring to position it in the tube. It contained 41 zinc bullets of 12 cm (prob. meaning circumference), each weighing 0.180 kg, and 9 composite shrapnel bullets of 1/8 each weighing 0.048 kg. The canister shot with a charge of 1.1 kg.

In 1875 a shrapnel shot was designed. It had a side of 8 mm thickness, the bottom was 16 mm thick. It contained 144 lead bullets of 1/18 and 116 wooden bullets. The explosive charge was 90 grams. It weighed 13.6 kg.

== Use ==
=== Effectiveness ===
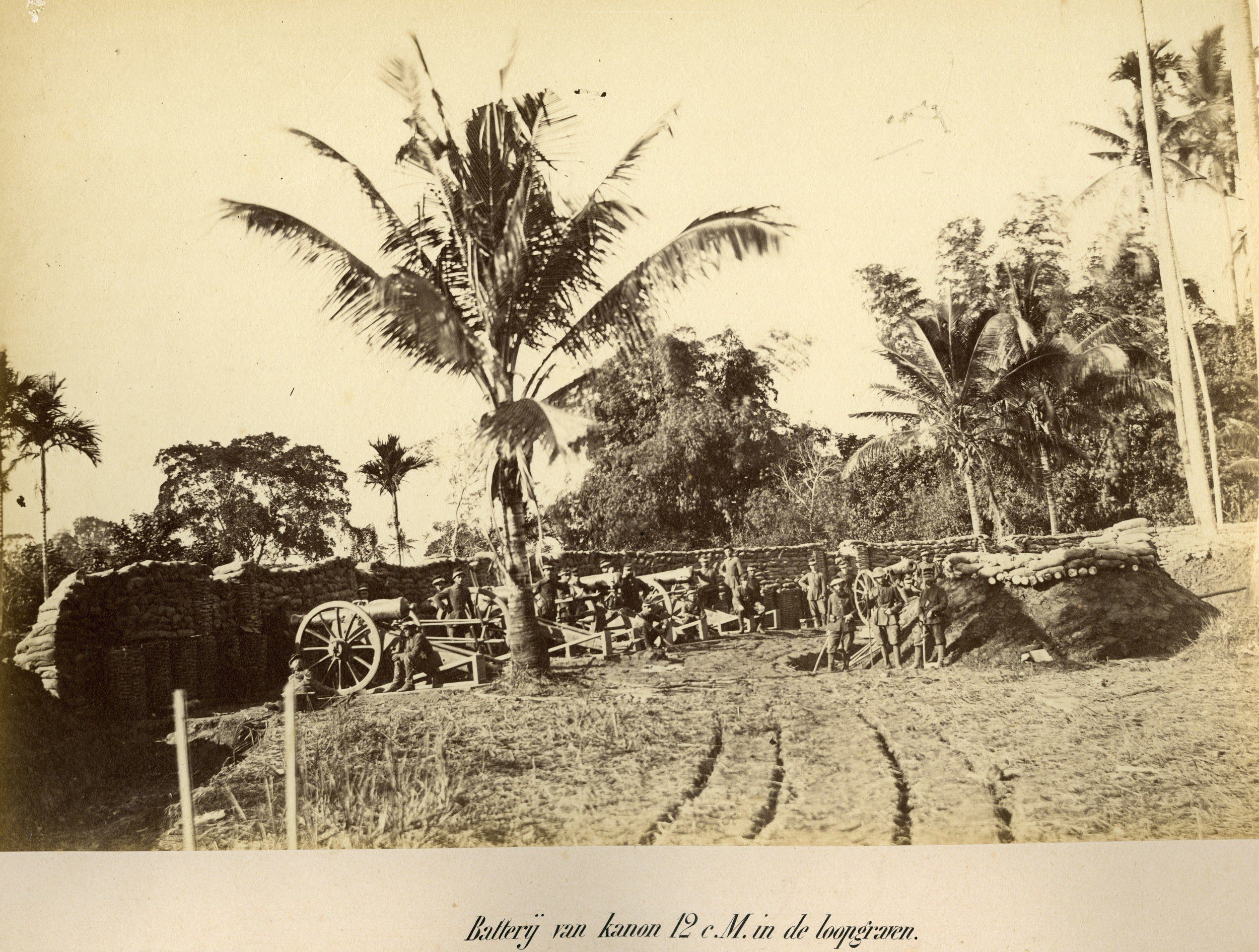
12 cm K.A.'s and RML's in the Second Aceh Expedition

Even while the first 12 cm K.A. were produced, it became clear that bronze was less suitable for guns that required a heavier powder charge. Therefore, the government wanted to order a coiled steel 15 cm gun and a coiled steel 12 cm long gun in 1875 for tests.

=== Army use ===
The 12 cm K.A. would be almost immediately put to use in the 1873 Second Aceh Expedition. In preparation 4 machine guns, 18 bronze RML's of 12 cm, and 8 12 cm K.A. were sent to the Dutch East Indies. During the expedition the 12 cm K.A. played a major role in the conquest of Banda Aceh, where it easily silenced the Aceh artillery. By 1879 the 12 cm K.A. was not so modern anymore. While it was still appreciated, the power of the 12 cm K.A. was classified as rather weak, and only suitably at short range.

=== Navy use ===
In total the navy had 189 12 cm K.A. of all numbers in stock on 1 July 1886. Of some ships it is known that they had either the 12 cm A No. 2 or the steel 12 cm A No. 1. In general the 12 cm A No. 2 was used by ships in the Dutch East Indies that were meant for internal security. Ships that were meant to combat foreign enemies, e.g. the Atjeh-class cruisers generally mounted the steel version.

== Gallery ==
Two 12 cm K.A. in Second Aceh Expedition

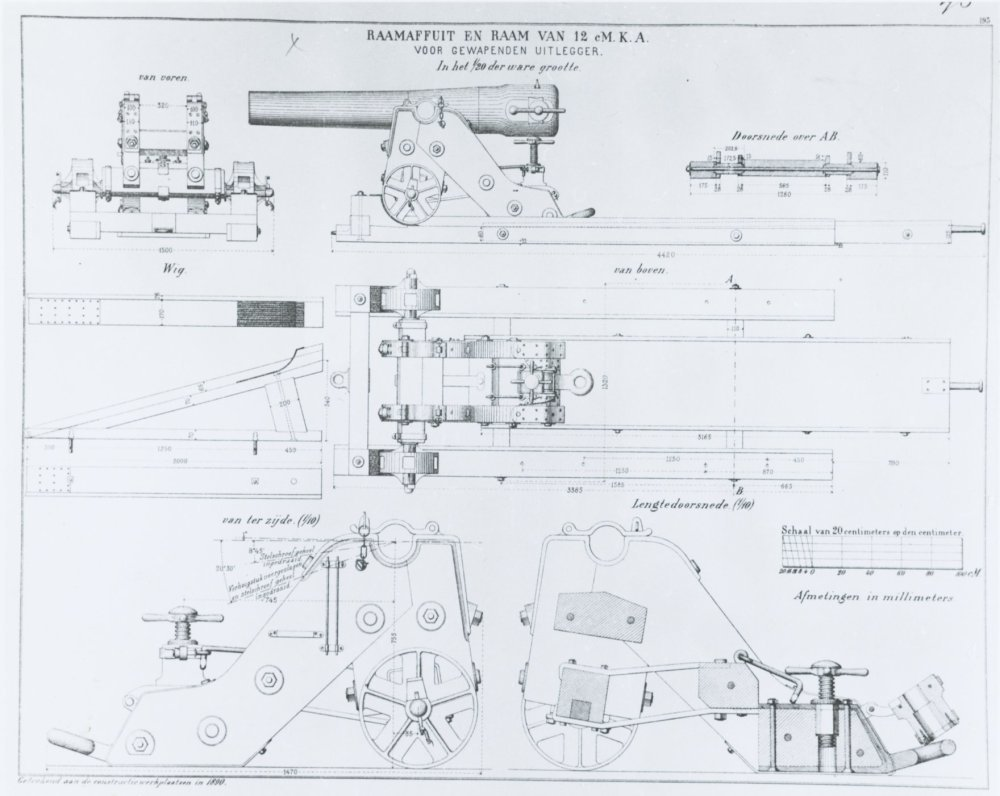
Drawing of carriage for Dutch 12 cm rifled bronze breechloader on flat keel barge (uitlegger).

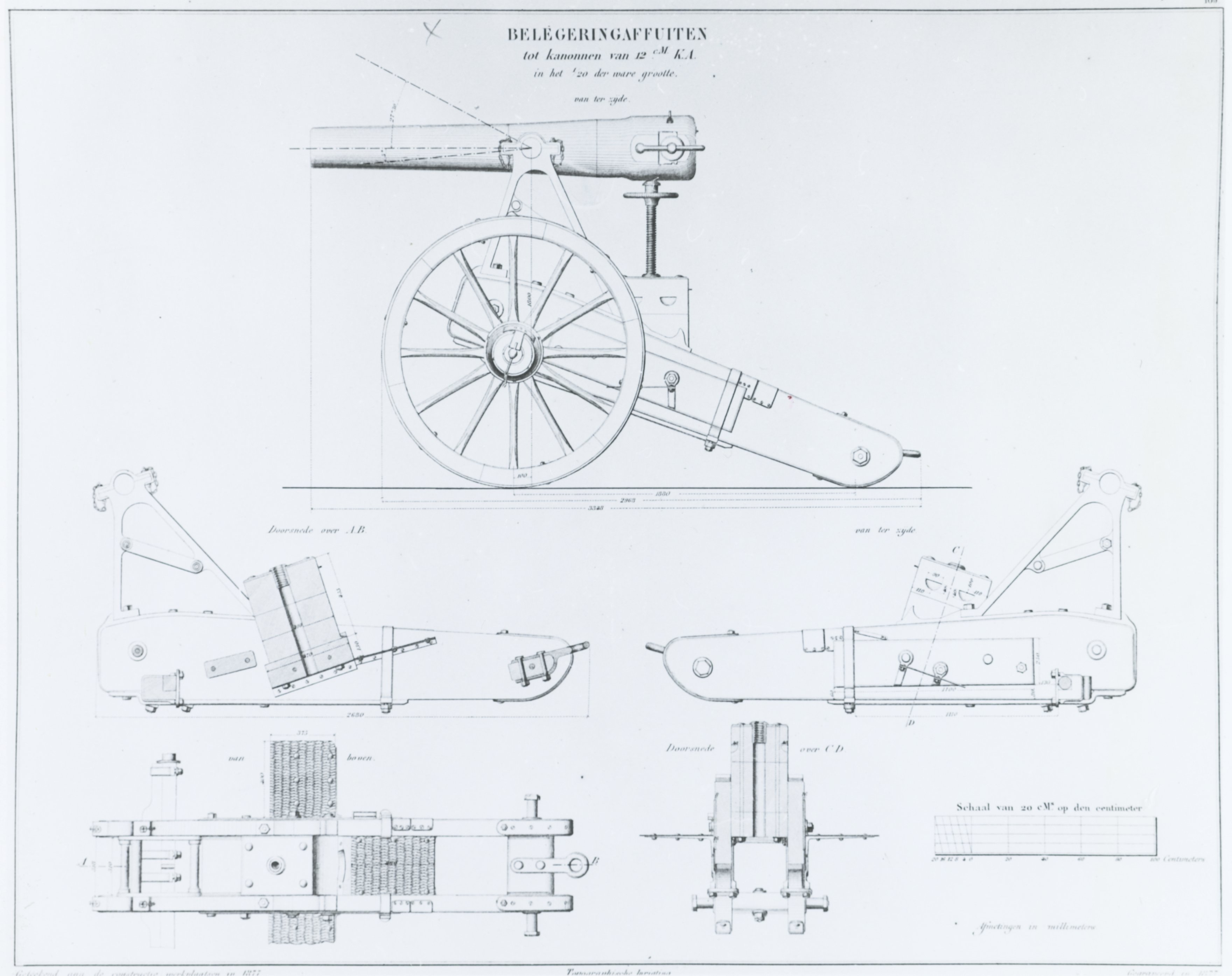
Drawing of Dutch breechloader 12 cm K.A. on siege carriage.

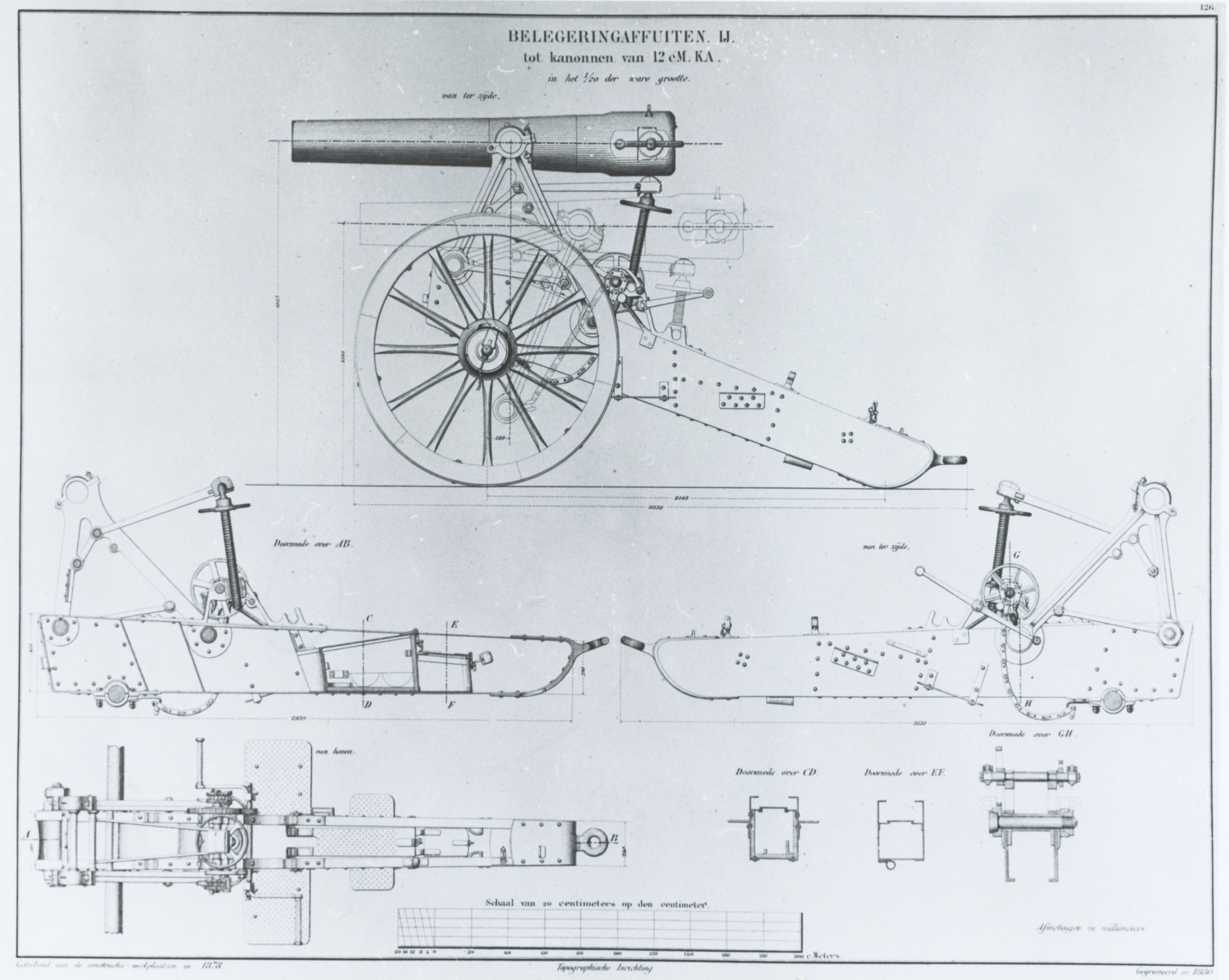
Drawing of Dutch 12 cm K.A. gun on siege carriage IJ. 'IJ' is undoubtedly short for IJzer.
