= HNLMS Van Speyk (1882) =

Atjeh-class unprotected cruiser

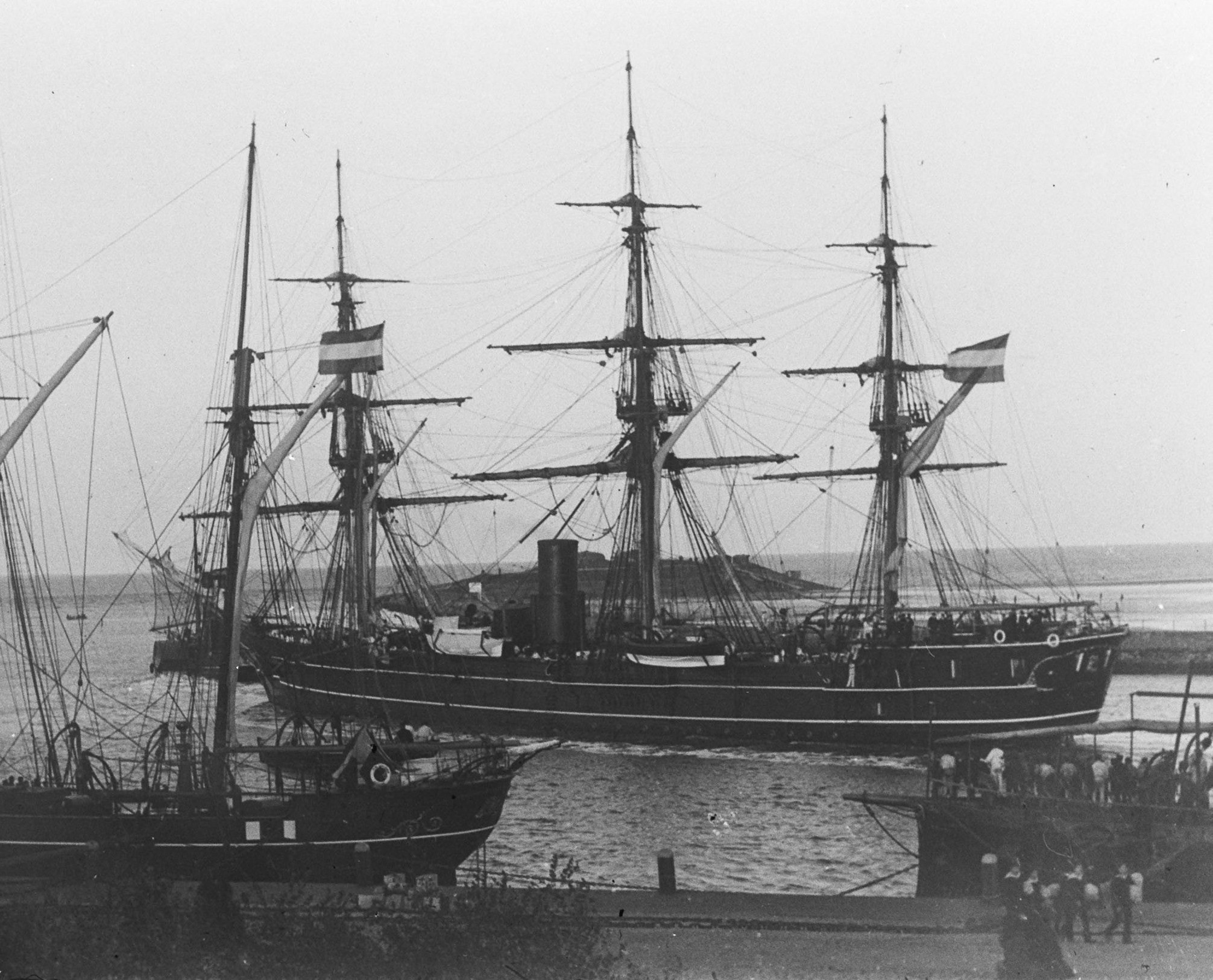

History

Netherlands
- Name: Van Speyk
- Namesake: Jan van Speyk
- Builder: Rijkswerf, Amsterdam
- Laid down: 9 February 1880
- Launched: 7 June 1882
- Completed: 16 July 1883

General characteristics (as completed)
- Class & type: Atjeh-class
- Displacement: 3,160 tons
- Length: 93.05 m (305 ft 3 in) (overall); 80.00 m (262 ft 6 in) (p/p)
- Beam: 12.497 m (41 ft 0 in)
- Draft: 6.706 m (22 ft 0 in)
- Installed power: Compound steam engine; nominal 370 kW (500 hp); effective 2,200 kW (3,000 ihp)
- Speed: 14 knots (26 km/h)
- Complement: 225
- Armament: 6 × 6.7 in (17 cm) (6 × 1); 8 × 4.7 in (12 cm) (8 × 1)
- Armour: engine behind coal bunkers

HNLMS Van Speyk (Dutch: Zr.Ms/Hr.Ms. Van Speyk), was an Atjeh-class unprotected cruiser built in Amsterdam for the Royal Netherlands Navy.

== Service history ==
Van Speyk was laid down at the Rijkswerf in Amsterdam on 9 February 1880. The launched took place on 7 June 1882. After the ship was completed on 16 July 1883 she left the Rijkswerf for Willemsoord, Den Helder, where her trials commenced.

Van Speyk was sent to the Dutch East Indies in 1887 where it participated in an expedition against Lombok and in the Aceh War. In 1903 Van Speyk was rebuilt as accommodation ship and commissioned at the naval base Willemsoord, Den Helder. From 1905 till 1940 she was in use as instruction vessel for stokers. The ship was sold for scrap in 1946 to a firm in Hendrik Ido Ambacht.
