= HNLMS Koningin Emma der Nederlanden =

Ship

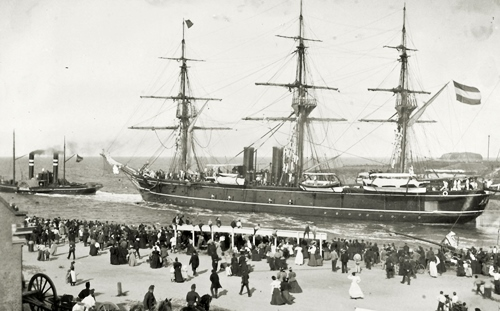
- HNLMS Koningin Emma der Nederlanden departing from Den Helder

History

Netherlands
- Name: Koningin Emma der Nederlanden
- Namesake: Emma of Waldeck and Pyrmont
- Ordered: 1874
- Builder: Rijkswerf, Amsterdam
- Laid down: November 1876
- Launched: 20 February 1879
- Commissioned: 1 December 1880
- Decommissioned: 23 June 1900
- In service: 1 December 1880
- Out of service: 1942
- Reclassified: as barracks ship, 1908
- Fate: Capsized in 1942, salvaged and later scuttled in April 1943

General characteristics
- Class & type: Atjeh-class unprotected cruiser
- Displacement: 3,160 long tons (3,210 t) (standard)
- Length: 91.85 m (301 ft 4 in)
- Beam: 12.5 m (41 ft 0 in)
- Draft: 6.1 m (20 ft 0 in)
- Propulsion: 1 × horizontal steam engine; 4 × fire-tube boiler; multiple sails
- Speed: 14.1 kn (26.1 km/h; 16.2 mph)
- Armament: 6 × 170 mm (6.7 in) guns; 8 × 12 cm K.A.; 4 × spar torpedoes

HNLMS Koningin Emma der Nederlanden (Dutch: Zr.Ms/Hr.Ms. Koningin Emma der Nederlanden) was an Atjeh-class unprotected cruiser of the Royal Dutch Navy.

== Service history ==
The ship was laid down as De Ruijter at the Rijkswerf in Amsterdam in November 1876. The ship was renamed to Koningin Emma der Nederlanden while still under construction on 7 January 1879 and launched on 20 February 1879. The ship was commissioned on 1 December 1880 and left for the Dutch East Indies on 13 January 1881.

In February 1900 she was stripped of her 170mm guns while still in the Dutch East Indies. The 170mm guns were then repurposed for coastal artillery in Soerabaja. She remained in service as a cruiser until 1900, when she was decommissioned on 23 June. Koningin Emma was then placed in reserve.

=== Barracks ship ===
In 1908 Koningin Emma became a barracks ship. The affair made some noise, because the Navy Department contracted with shipyard De Lastdrager in Nieuwediep on 20 December 1907, without a public tender. The price was 110,060 guilders, but somebody remarked that the engines alone were worth 40,000 guilders, and that the deal was very profitable for De Lastdrager. Koningin Emma would next serve as barracks ship for the torpedo service.

=== World War II ===
After the loss of the Battle of the Netherlands by the Dutch forces, Koningin Emma der Nederlanden fell into German hands. The Germans used the ship for accommodation purposes as well. On 21 June 1940 the ship was attacked by the RAF and was heavily damaged. The Germans repaired the ship at Rijkswerf in Amsterdam. Several months later, she re-entered service.

In 1942 Koningin Emma capsized and sunk in her home port. It still remains unclear why she sank, but it is most likely that the ship was sabotaged by the Dutch Resistance. In 1943 the ship was salved by the former Dutch Bergungsschiffe 10. She was next towed to the open sea and scuttled in April 1943.
