= HNLMS Koning der Nederlanden =

19th-century ship built in the Netherlands

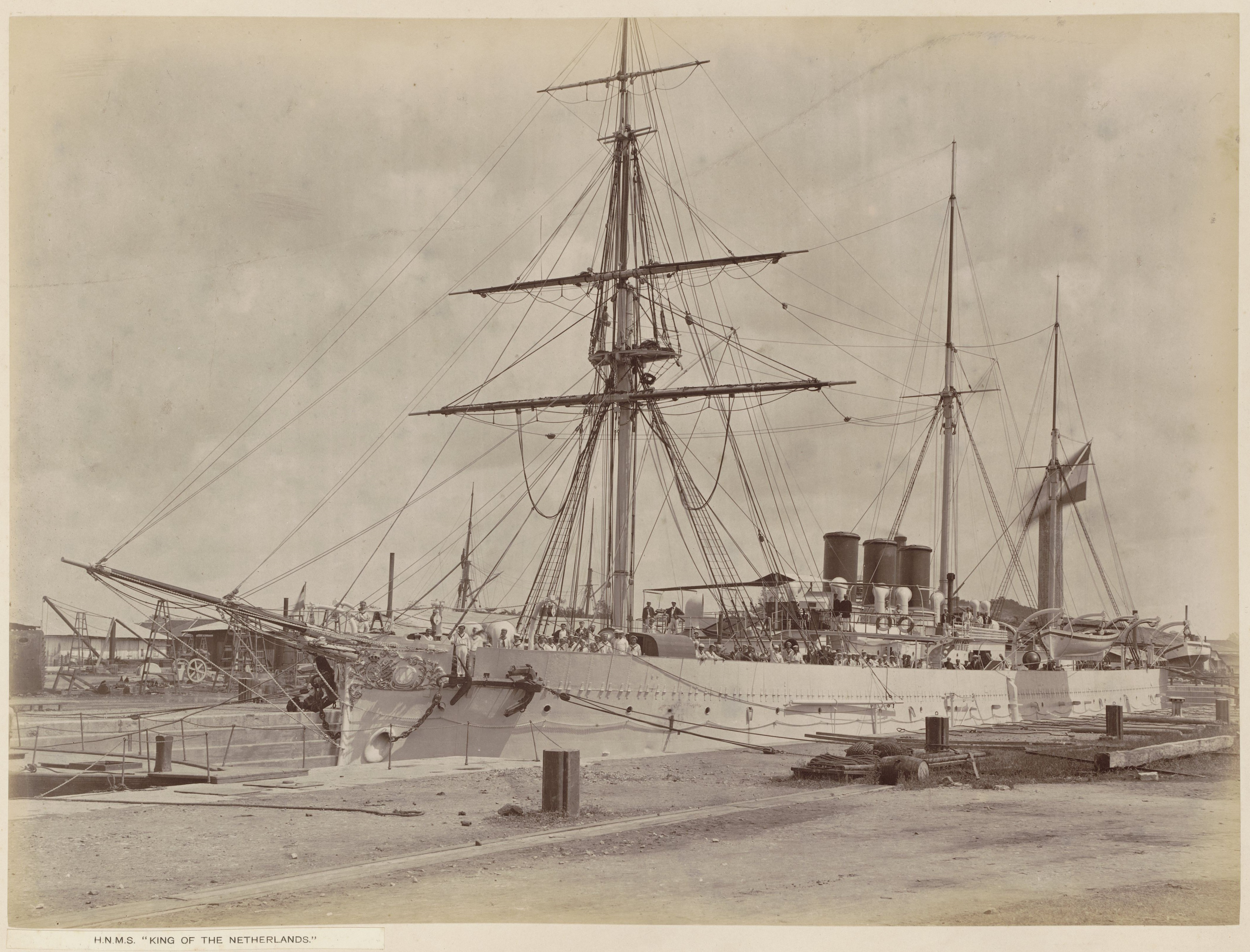
- Koning der Nederlanden in Singpapore dock

History

Netherlands
- Name: Koning der Nederlanden
- Namesake: King of the Netherlands
- Builder: Rijkswerf, Amsterdam
- Cost: 3,220,170 florins
- Laid down: 31 December 1871
- Launched: 28 October 1874
- Commissioned: 16 February 1877
- Decommissioned: 1 April 1895
- Reclassified: 1 December 1899 as accommodation and guard ship
- Fate: Scuttled 2 March 1942

General characteristics
- Type: Ironclad turret ship
- Displacement: 5,400 metric tons (5,300 long tons)
- Length: 268 ft 4 in (81.8 m) (p/p)
- Beam: 49 ft 10 in (15.2 m)
- Draught: 19 ft 3 in (5.9 m)
- Installed power: 4,630 ihp (3,450 kW)
- Propulsion: 2 shafts, 2 Compound steam engines; 7 boilers
- Sail plan: Barque-rigged
- Speed: 12 knots (22 km/h; 14 mph)
- Complement: 256
- Armament: 2 × 2 - 11-inch (279 mm) muzzle-loading rifles; 4 × 1 - 120 mm (5 in) Krupp breech-loading guns; 6 × 1 - 37-millimetre (1.5 in) Hotchkiss 5-barreled revolving guns
- Armour: Belt: 150–200 mm (6–8 in); Gun turrets: 230–305 mm (9–12 in)

HNLMS Koning der Nederlanden (Note: "HNLMS" stands for "His Netherlands Majesty's Ship" but the Royal Netherlands Navy uses "Zr. Ms." (Dutch: Zijner Majesteits schip) instead of the international HNLMS.) was an iron-hulled ironclad ramtorenschip (turret ram ship) built by the Rijkswerf at Amsterdam for the Royal Netherlands Navy in the early 1870s. It was the largest ship to serve in the Dutch Navy during the 19th century and the closest to a Battleship the Dutch Navy would ever have. The ship was converted to a barracks ship in the late 1890s and stationed at Surabaya in the Dutch East Indies. Koning der Nederlanden was scuttled in Surabaya on 2 March 1942, during the Battle of Java, to prevent her capture by the Japanese.

== Design and description ==
HNLMS Koning der Nederlanden was the largest ship built for the Dutch Navy during the 19th century. She was fitted with a ram that protruded 1.22 meters (4 ft 0 in) from the bow. The ship's gun turrets were only 3.3 meters (10 ft 10 in) above the waterline, but the freeboard could be increased by use of hinged bulwarks. The turrets were rotated by hydraulic machinery.

The ship had a length between perpendiculars of 268 feet 4 inches (81.8 m), a beam of 49 feet 10 inches (15.2 m), and a draught of 19 feet 3 inches (5.87 m). She displaced 5,400 tonnes (5,300 long tons). Her crew consisted of 256 officers and men.

=== Propulsion ===
Koning der Nederlanden had two compound steam engines, built by Penn and Sons, each driving a single 4.876-meter (16.0 ft) propeller. The engines were powered by seven boilers. The engines produced a total of 4,630 indicated horsepower (3,450 kW) which gave the ship a maximum speed of 11.95 knots (22.13 km/h; 13.75 mph) during her sea trials that began on 26 July 1877. She carried 620 long tons (630 t) of coal and had three funnels. The ship was barque-rigged with three masts and had a total sail area of 847 square meters (9,120 sq ft), although these would rarely be used in practice.

=== Armament ===
The ship mounted a pair of Armstrong 11-inch (279 mm) rifled muzzle-loading guns in each gun turret. Each gun weighed 25.4 long tons (25.8 t). Four 120-millimeter (4.7 in) Krupp breech-loading guns were mounted on the upper deck and six 37-millimeter (1.5 in) Hotchkiss 5-barrel revolving guns were also fitted in the ship's superstructure. They fired a shell weighing about 1.1 lb (0.50 kg) at a muzzle velocity of about 2,000 ft/s (610 m/s) to a range about 3,500 yards (3,200 m). They had a rate of fire of about 30 rounds per minute The ship was initially armed with spar torpedoes, but they were removed shortly after completion.

=== Armor ===
Koning der Nederlanden had a complete waterline belt of wrought iron that was 200 millimeters (7.9 in) thick amidships, but reduced to 150 millimeters (5.9 in) at the bow and stern. Each gun turret, and its base, was protected by 230-millimeter (9.1 in) armor plates, although the total thickness around the gun ports was 305 millimeters (12 in). The deck was unarmored.

== Service ==
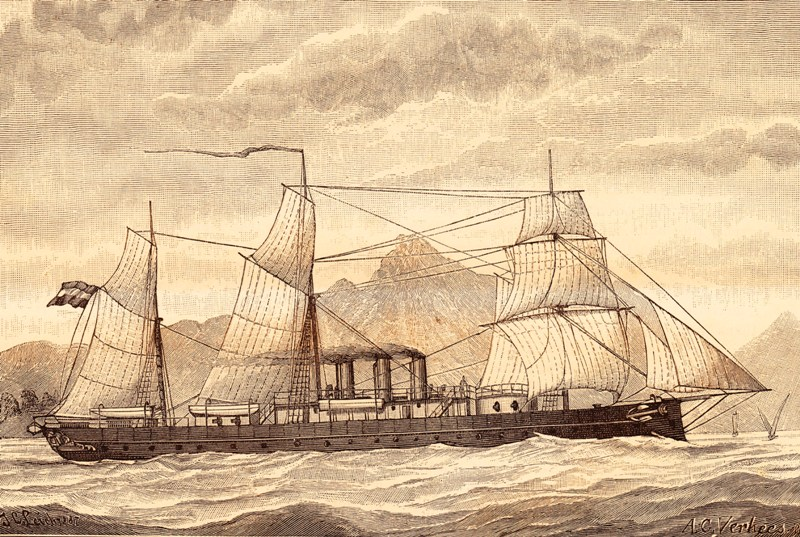
Koning der Nederlanden

Koning der Nederlanden was laid down at the Rijkswerf in Amsterdam on 31 December 1871. She was launched on 20 October 1874 and commissioned on 16 February 1877. The ship was designed by B.J. Tideman and renamed from Matador to Koning der Nederlanden during construction. In the autumn of 1876 the ship was transferred through the newly built North Sea Canal to the naval yard Willemsoord in Den Helder. In September 1877 she carried out see trials on the North and Baltic Sea. She left the Netherlands on 3 March 1878 for the Dutch East Indies where she arrived in Aceh on 6 may that year.

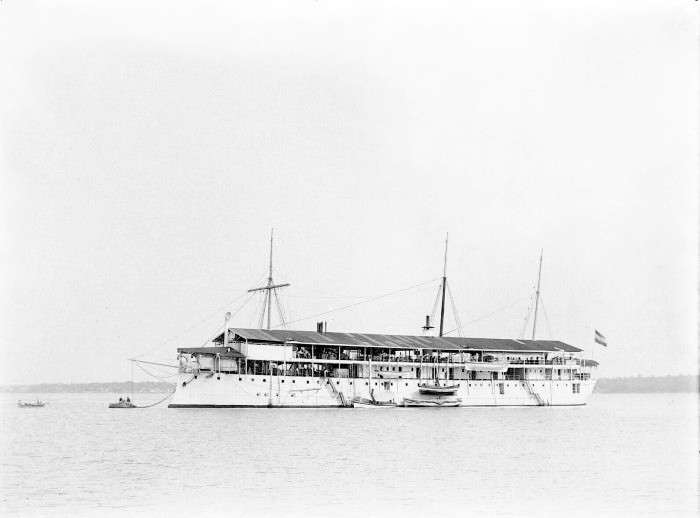
Koning der Nederlanden after she became an accommodation hulk

From there she steamed to Batavia where she arrived in June 1878 and was repaired at Surabaya from August until November that year. At the end of the year she was stationed at Batavia and served in the Auxiliary squadron. In May and June 1880 she made a trip to the Timor Archipelago to show the Dutch flag. From March till August 1881 Koning der Nederlanden was stationed at Cirebon. She was there to support measures taken by the civil government to counter the in- and export of cattle in the region. In late January 1882 she was again sent to Cirebon due to the outbreak of cholera. The ship was recalled after a few weeks and send to Riau for practice. In April and July 1883 she practiced respectively along the north coast of Java and the Sunda Strait. On 1 August she replaced Zeeland as guard ship at Batavia. After an outbreak of cholera on board later that year the crew disinfected the ship in late September. Koning der Nederlanden was since December 1883 in Surabaya for repairs to her boilers. The boilers were later replaced in 1885 at Surabaya. In April 1887 she was sent together with Prins Hendrik der Nederlanden to Makassar for a three-month practice. From 25 June 1889 until 1 January 1893 she was attached to the naval force stationed on the north coast of Aceh. After that she served as station ship in Olehleh, Aceh until 7 February 1895.

The 37-millimeter guns were replaced by two quick-firing, 75-millimeter (3.0 in) guns and four 37-millimeter quick-firers by 1890. The ship decommissioned on 1 April 1895 and began her conversion to an accommodation and guard ship at Surabaya Dockyard in August 1896. She retained all four of her 120-millimeter and two of her 37-millimeter guns when she recommissioned on 1 December 1899.

From 1920 till 1922 she served as debarkment and accommodation ship for the Submarine Service. After this, she returned to serving as an accommodation and guard ship. Her retained weapons were still operational when she was set on fire in Surabaya and scuttled to prevent her capture by the Japanese during World War II on 2 March 1942.
