= Atjeh-class cruiser =

Class of unprotected cruisers of the Royal Netherlands Navy

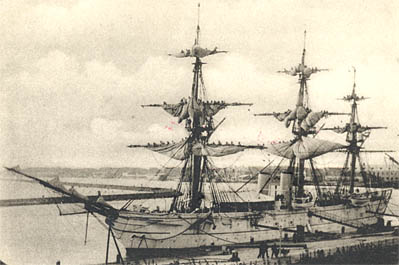
- Tromp

Class overview
- Name: Atjeh class
- Builders: Rijkswerf, Amsterdam
- Operators: Royal Netherlands Navy
- Cost: 2,000,000+ guilders
- In commission: 1877–1908
- Completed: 6
- Scrapped: 6

General characteristics
- Type: Unprotected cruiser
- Displacement: 3,425 tons
- Length: 93.05 m (305 ft 3 in) (overall); 80.00 m (262 ft 6 in) (p/p)
- Beam: 12.497 m (41 ft 0 in)
- Draught: 6.706 m (22 ft 0 in)
- Propulsion: 2,500 kW (3,300 hp)
- Speed: 14 knots (26 km/h)
- Complement: 306
- Armament: 6 × 17 cm A No. 1 (6 × 1); 8 x 12 cm K.A. No. 1 (8 × 1)

The Atjeh class was a class of unprotected cruisers of the Royal Netherlands Navy. The class comprised Atjeh, Tromp, Koningin Emma der Nederlanden, De Ruyter, Van Speyk and Johan Willem Friso.

== Context ==
=== Replacing steam corvettes with unprotected cruisers ===
In the 1860s the Netherlands had given priority to building an armored fleet for coastal defense in Europe. Meanwhile, the Dutch East Indies were primarily defended by the steam corvettes called screw steamships first class (Djambi-class corvettes, Zilveren Kruis-class corvette). In late 1870 the minister for the navy ordered the first ship meant to replace these, the ironclad Koning der Nederlanden. Somewhat later the government decided to replace part of the screw steamships first class with unprotected cruisers (ongepantserde kruisers), even though these would also be called screw steamships first class. Later, the armored part would be supplemented by the ironclad Prins Hendrik der Nederlanden, which would be sent to the Indies in 1876. A third armored ship was planned, but postponed 'in order to first gain more experience in the use of armored ships in the tropics'.

There were two very different perspectives on the Atjeh class. In December 1882 the minister of the navy dismissed the term 'cruiser' for the Atjeh class, and stated that he was replacing the old screw corvettes. Furthermore, that the design fit the requirements for the defense of the Dutch East Indies. The well known columnist Nautilus had a very different view. He stated that the Atjeh class was only suitable for cruiser tasks, not for defending the colonies. As a cruiser he thought that it might be a good design, but rather costly.

== Design ==
=== The first unprotected cruiser design ===
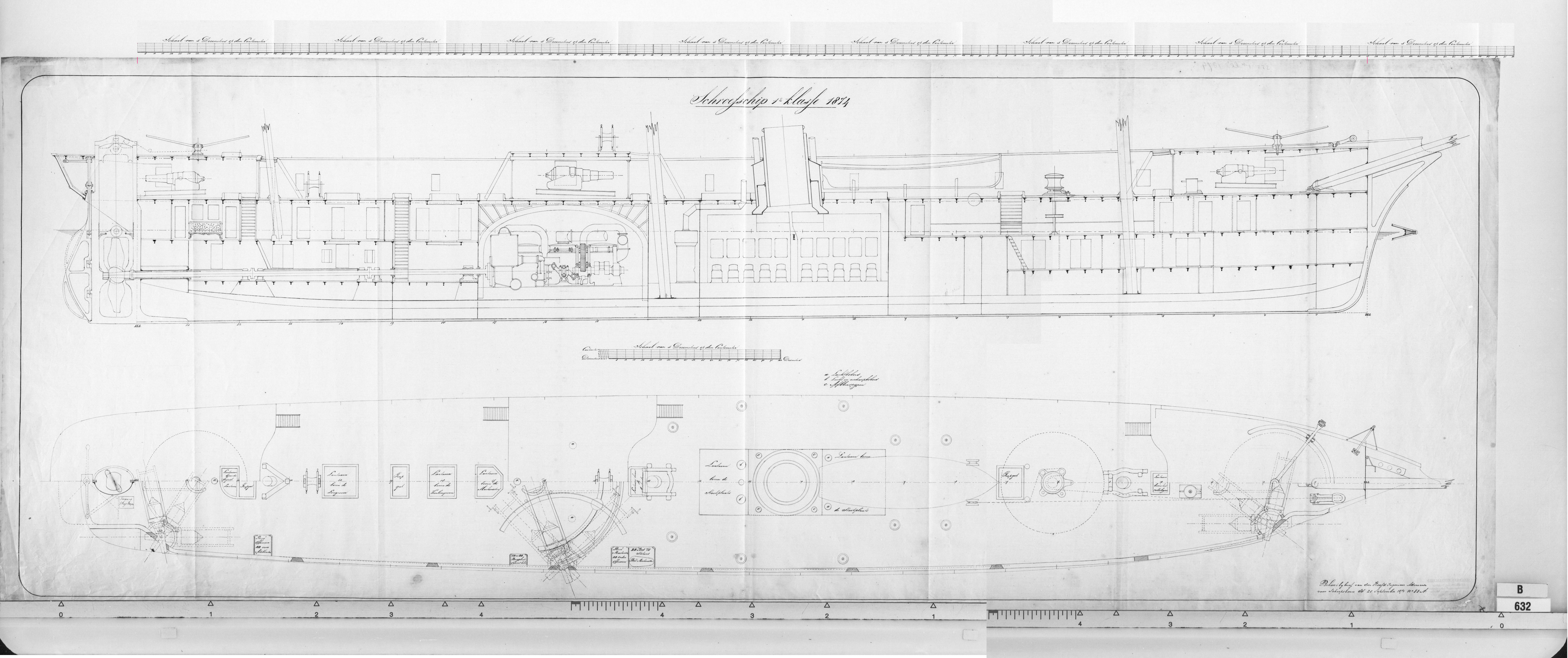
First design of the Atjeh class

The first requirements for the ship were determined by Minister for the Navy, Taalman Kip, who had been appointed in May 1874. These called for a ship of no more than 200 men, costing less than 1.5 million guilders. It would be armed with one central 23 cm Armstrong RML, two 18 cm Armstrong RML (fore and aft) and four 12 cm breechloaders. The machines could not be compound, and cruising speed should be 11 knots (20 km/h; 13 mph), with a trial speed of 14 knots (26 km/h; 16 mph). The proposed design was a ship 72.00 m (236 ft 3 in) long between perpendiculars, had a 11.32 m (37 ft 2 in) beam, a 5.66 m (18 ft 7 in) draft, and 2,345 t (2,308 long tons) displacement.

This ship would have been considerably longer and narrower, and somewhat bigger than the preceding Zilveren Kruis-class corvettes. The result would have been a screw corvette with a sloop-like armament. With considerably higher speed and better armament, it might have stood up to foreign designs. However, while judging this design, it was noted that the boilers were too high above the normal load line. This would make the ship extremely vulnerable, because it primarily depended on its engines for propulsion. Therefore a new requirement was added, demanding that the steam engines and boilers should be below the empty load line, and be protected by the coal bunkers.

=== The final design ===
The requirement to place the steam engines of the new unprotected cruisers below the load line necessitated the design of a substantially bigger ship. Meanwhile, the bridge, fore- and aft castle of the original design were replaced by a spar deck. This new design was approved on 18 December 1874. All this made the Atjeh class 21 m (68 ft 11 in) longer, but still narrower than the Zilveren Kruis class it was to replace. Such a narrow hull was not desirable, but a wider hull would have required much heavier engines, making the ship too expensive in total.

=== Two subclasses ===
At least two subclasses can be discerned in the Atjeh class. The first three ships had traditional steam engines, later ships had compound engines, which led to a substantial difference in power and range. The second group was also somewhat larger in overall length and draft.

The beam was largest for Johan Willem Friso. She was planned to be different from the second group (De Ruyter, Van Speyk, Doggersbank and Kortenaer), but when the last two were burnt, she had to re-use the engines of Doggersbank (which had not been installed yet), and the stern of Kortenaer. This made her almost equal to De Ruyter and Van Speyk. Nevertheless, her depth of hold was also significantly larger than that of the other two.

=== Dimensions ===
According to the final design, the ships of the class were 80.00 m (262 ft 6 in) long between perpendiculars and 92 m (301 ft 10 in) overall. Their beam was 12.50 m (41 ft 0 in), depth of hold 10.00 m (32 ft 10 in), and maximum draft was 5.56 m (18 ft 3 in) fore and 6.10 m (20 ft 0 in) aft. Displacement would be 3,180 t (3,130 long tons). However, displacement depends on load. Normally empty and fully loaded displacement differ significantly. With the Atjeh displacement was further increased by adding extra guns later.

Name	Length overall	Beam	Draft 1884	Draft 1893	Displacement 1884	Displacement 1893	Coal
Atjeh	91.85 m (301 ft 4 in)	12.5 m (41 ft 0 in)	6.3 m (20 ft 8 in)	6.5 m (21 ft 4 in)	3,160 t (3,110 long tons)	3,565 t (3,509 long tons)	440 t (430 long tons)
Tromp	91.85 m (301 ft 4 in)	12.5 m (41 ft 0 in)	6.3 m (20 ft 8 in)	6.5 m (21 ft 4 in)	3,160 t (3,110 long tons)	3,565 t (3,509 long tons)	470 t (460 long tons)
Koningin Emma der Nederlanden (ex-De Ruyter)	91.85 m (301 ft 4 in)	12.5 m (41 ft 0 in)	6.3 m (20 ft 8 in)	6.5 m (21 ft 4 in)	3,160 t (3,110 long tons)	3,565 t (3,509 long tons)	470 t (460 long tons)
De Ruyter	92.1 m (302 ft 2 in)	13.1 m (43 ft 0 in)	6.3 m (20 ft 8 in)	6.8 m (22 ft 4 in)	3,160 t (3,110 long tons)	3,480 t (3,430 long tons)	360 t (350 long tons)
Van Speyk	92.1 m (302 ft 2 in)	13.1 m (43 ft 0 in)	6.3 m (20 ft 8 in)	7 m (23 ft 0 in)	3,160 t (3,110 long tons)	3,575 t (3,519 long tons)	360 t (350 long tons)
Johan Willem Friso	92.1 m (302 ft 2 in)	13.1 m (43 ft 0 in)	6.3 m (20 ft 8 in)	6.9 m (22 ft 8 in)	3,160 t (3,110 long tons)	3,598 t (3,541 long tons)	400 t (390 long tons)

The ships would be made of iron, covered with wood and zinc. The third ship of the class, Koningin Emma (ex-De Ruyter), would use steel for that part of the hull which was above the load line, and also in some other parts of the hull. This would save weight. As mentioned, under water, the hull was iron covered with teak and then zinc. This gave cathodic protection, making that the zinc corroded instead of the iron, and the zinc caught the stuff that grew on the hull. The Iron and wood were connected by Haij's Marine Composition. On Atjeh this connection was made without closing the seams. On Tromp, these seems were closed, and contact nails were hammered through the wood to make contact with the iron hull, so the galvanic effect was increased. The last ship, Johan Willem Friso, would use copper on the outside, instead of zinc.

=== Propulsion ===
The steam engines of the first three ships were reciprocating engines. The specifications were made by the inspectors of the national steam service, F.H.P. van Alphen and F.W. Hudig. Next Koninklijke Fabriek van Stoom- en andere Werktuigen and Fijenoord together made a design for the engines. The steam engines for Atjeh were built by Koninklijke Fabriek van Stoom- en andere Werktuigen. Those for Tromp were built by Fijenoord. The steam engines for Koningin Emma were built by Koninklijke Fabriek.

These reciprocating engines had two cylinders of 1.83 m (6 ft 0 in) diameter. Stroke length was 0.66 m (2 ft 2 in). There were four boilers, which were fired at both ends. At each boiler end, there were three fires. The engines were rated at 2,500 kilowatts (3,300 ihp) and produced a top speed of 14 knots (26 km/h; 16 mph). On her trials, Atjeh made the required speed by steaming 14.5 knots (26.9 km/h; 16.7 mph). The engine had 2,050 kW (2,750 ihp) and a modest coal consumption.

The fourth and later ships got compound steam engines. The steam engines of De Ruyter were built by Fijenoord, according to 'Sell's' system. This enabled the use of the machine as a regular steam engine, with lower pressure. This was useful if the boilers were weak, or in case the ship was fighting batteries.

The first three ships had a machine to lift the propeller. With some provisions this enabled the crew to clean the propeller without visiting a shipyard.

In 1878 Atjeh made a trial cruise in the North Sea. With a wind of 5-6 beaufort, she made 8.5 knots (15.7 km/h; 9.8 mph) under sail. This was deemed very good for a steamer with auxiliary sailing capacity.

=== Armament ===
When Atjeh was laid down, she was reported to get an armament of one central 23 cm RML, four 15 cm Krupp breechloaders (two fore and two aft), and some 12 cm breechloaders in the sides. The two 18 cm RMLs of the first design had been replaced, but the 23 cm RML was still part of the plan at that time. In October 1875 another change in plan determined the armament of Atjeh and Tromp to the all breechloaders configuration (six 17 cm guns) with which they were launched.

When she was launched, the armament of Atjeh had been determined at six 17 cm Krupp breechloaders. These were all placed on the gun deck. One near the bow, one near the stern, and four more to the center of the ship. Large gun ports in bow and stern would enable these guns to fire along the line of the keel. The broadside would be four 17 cm guns.

At the time the Dutch referred to the 17 cm Krupp breechloader simply as 'Kanon van 17 cm A.' with 'A' standing for Achterlaad i.e. breechloader. Later a different 17 cm breechloader model was used on other ships. The gun on the Atjeh class then became known as 17 cm A. No. 1, the newer gun used on HNLMS Koningin Wilhelmina der Nederlanden and HNLMS Reinier Claeszen became known as 17 cm A. No. 2.

The secondary armament of Atjeh would be determined later on. One hoped to add four 12 cm K.A. No. 1 breechloaders, and after launch this indeed proved to be possible. Therefore, the first ships were finished with six 170 mm (6.7 in) guns and four single 120 mm (4.7 in) guns. The fourth ship, De Ruyter, was planned to have eight 12 cm breechloaders from the start.

== Construction ==
All eight ships were laid down at the Rijkswerf in Amsterdam and launched between 1876 and 1886. Two were destroyed in a yard fire in 1883 and never completed.

Name	Laid down	Launched	Commissioned	Fate
Atjeh	3 March 1875	6 November 1876	1 November 1877	1899 decommissioned, 1906 rebuilt as accommodation ship, 1922 out of service
Tromp	23 August 1875	December 1877	1 September 1882	5 June 1902 decommissioned, 1904 sold for scrapping
Koningin Emma der Nederlanden (ex-De Ruyter)	November 1876	20 February 1879	1 December 1880	Named De Ruyter until January 1879. Decommissioned in 1900, scuttled in 1943
De Ruyter	7 January 1879	22 September 1880	1 August 1885	27 May 1899 decommissioned, 1900 sold for scrapping
Van Speyk	9 February 1880	7 June 1882	1 March 1887	16 September 1897 decommissioned, 1904 accommodation ship, 1946 sold for scrapping
Doggersbank (ex-Kortenaer)	1881	—N/a	—N/a	Renamed Doggersbank on 5 August 1881. 20 June 1883 destroyed by fire shortly before launch.
Kortenaer	November 1882	—N/a	—N/a	Laid down as Kortenaer, seventh of the class. Lost to fire on 20 June 1883, while only a keel and some frames.
Johan Willem Friso	22 October 1883	10 June 1886	1 February 1888	16 September 1897, scrapped 1899

== See also ==
- List of cruisers of the Netherlands
