= HNLMS Tromp (1877) =

Atjeh-class unprotected cruiser

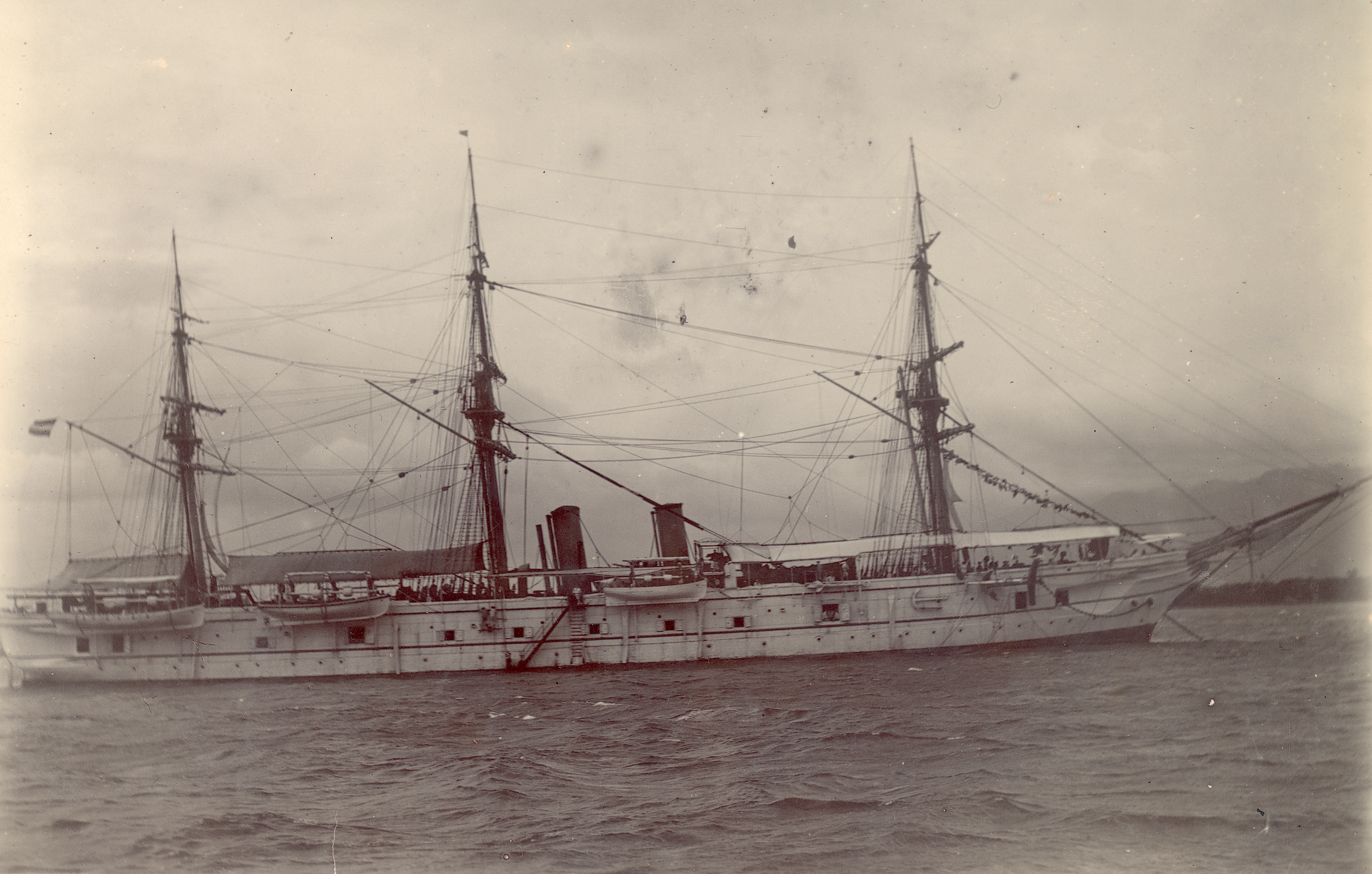

History

Netherlands
- Name: Tromp
- Builder: Rijkswerf, Amsterdam
- Laid down: 23 August 1875
- Launched: December 1877
- Commissioned: 1 September 1882
- Decommissioned: 1904

General characteristics (as completed)
- Class & type: Atjeh-class
- Displacement: 3,160 tons
- Length: 93.05 m (305 ft 3 in) (overall); 80.00 m (262 ft 6 in) (p/p)
- Beam: 12.497 m (41 ft 0 in)
- Draft: 6.706 m (22 ft 0 in)
- Installed power: Compound steam engine; nominal 370 kW (500 hp); effective 2,200 kW (3,000 ihp)
- Speed: 14 knots (26 km/h)
- Complement: 225
- Armament: 6 × 6.7 in (17 cm) (6 × 1); 8 × 4.7 in (12 cm) (8 × 1)
- Armour: engine behind coal bunkers

HNLMS Tromp (Dutch: Zr.Ms/Hr.Ms. Tromp), was an Atjeh-class unprotected cruiser built in Amsterdam for the Royal Netherlands Navy.

== Service history ==
Tromp was laid down at the Rijkswerf in Amsterdam on 23 August 1875. The launched took place in December 1877. After the ship was completed Tromp was escorted by the monitor Guinea from the Rijkswerf to Willemsoord, Den Helder, where she arrived on 30 May 1879. At Willemsoord the ship had to undergo trials after which it was placed in reserve. The ship was commissioned on 1 September 1882.

The ship left for the Dutch East Indies in October 1882 and returned a year later. On the journey home she was sent to check on Maculla on the Congo River where locals had attacked a Dutch factory. In 1885 she left again for the Dutch East Indies staying there for two years. Between 1888 and 1890 she made several voyages to Norway, South America and the West Indies. In 1893 Tromp was again sent to the Dutch East Indies where she oversaw pearl diving activities in the Easter parts of the Dutch East Indies. In July 1894 she participated in a military expedition against Lombok. She served as station ship at Olehleh Aceh. April till June 1896 she participated in the shelling of Kampongs in that region. 1987 she returned to Europe and from 18 March till 15 May she was present at Smyrna, Asia Minor to protect Dutch interest in the region. In 1899 she again left for the Dutch East Indies where she served as flagship for the Aceh division. In 1902 she returned to the Netherlands and was sold for scrap in 1904.
