= Anna Paulowna-class frigate =

Dutch class of steam frigates

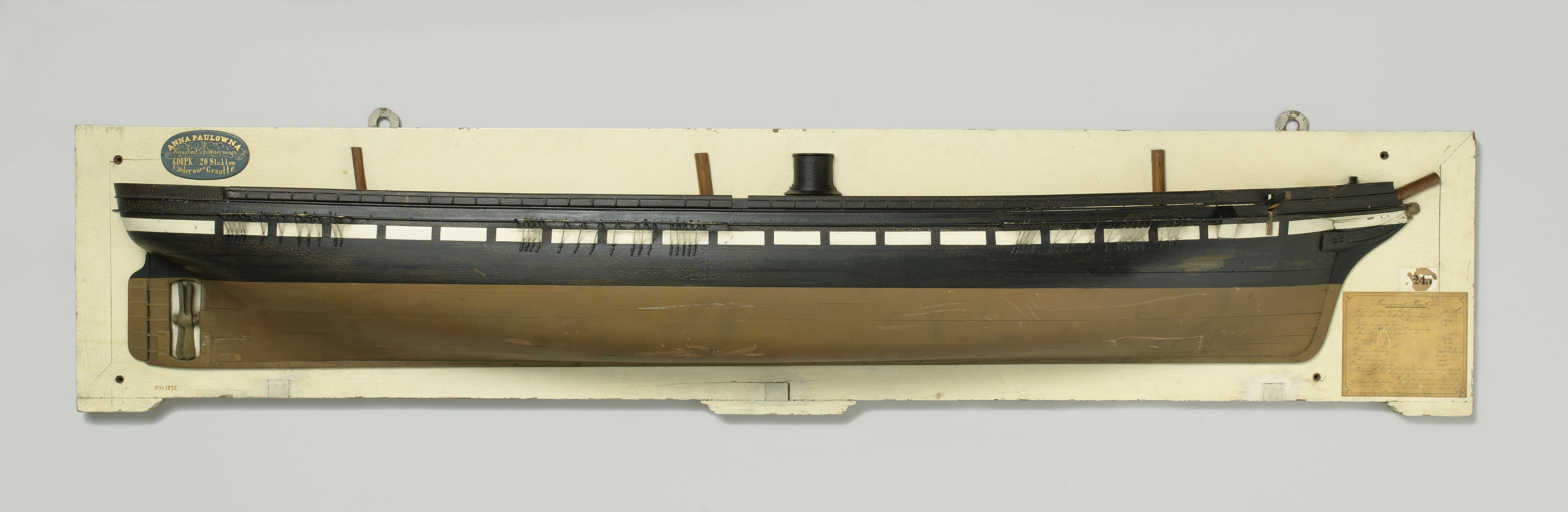
- Half model of Anna Paulowna

Class overview
- Name: Anna Paulowna class
- Builders: Rijkswerf (Amsterdam)
- Operators: Royal Netherlands Navy
- Planned: 2
- Completed: 1

General characteristics
- Type: Steam Frigate
- Displacement: 3,398 tons
- Length: 76.00 m (249 ft 4 in) (p/p)
- Beam: 13.30 m (43 ft 8 in)
- Draught: 5.35 m (17 ft 7 in) (fore); 6.15 m (20 ft 2 in) (aft)
- Depth of hold: 7.04 m
- Installed power: 600 hp (450 kW) (nominal)

The Anna Paulowna class was a class of steam frigates of the Royal Netherlands Navy. Only Anna Paulowna was completed, parts of Van Galen were used to build the steam corvette Zilveren Kruis.

== Dutch Naval Plans in the 1860s ==
=== Plan 1855 ===
In May 1855 the Dutch Secretary for the navy Smit van den Broecke, presented an overall plan for the fleet at home and in the East Indies. The heaviest ships of the new fleet would be 3 screw steam frigates of 400 hp, 50 guns and 500 men, to be stationed in the Netherlands. The standard fighting warship for the East Indies would be a screw corvette of 250 hp, 12 30-pounders and 125 men, of which 12 would be built. For policing the many outposts in the Indies 15 sloops of 100 hp, 12 guns and 85 men would be built. These would be supplemented by small steam paddle ships that would navigate rivers and shallow waters. Of his successors, Johannes Servaas Lotsy held office from August 1856 till March 1861. He would execute a good part of this plan.

=== Minister Huyssen van Kattendijke ===
In March 1861 Willem Huyssen van Kattendijke was appointed as Minister of the Navy. Unlike his predecessor Johannes Servaas Lotsy, he was a career officer. Huyssen van Kattendijke thought it impossible to execute Plan 1855 with the budgets that were normally allowed for the navy. Especially when the cost of a single ship could be 6 million guilders.

For home defense, Huyssen van Kattendijke thought that the ideas behind the Plan 1855 were outdated, because of the appearance of armored ships like the French ironclad Gloire. He had doubts about the effectiveness of the plan 1855 frigates for this role. Instead, he wanted to rely on floating batteries and steam gunboats mounting a single piece of the heaviest ordnance.

For the Dutch East Indies, Huyssen van Kattendijke thought that the steam frigates with auxiliary power and 500 men were too costly to operate. He envisioned a much smaller ship called kuilkorvet, which translates as 'covered gun deck corvette' (kuil means gundeck). It was to have a covered gun deck with 22 guns, and no guns above that deck. It would have a complement of 250 men and engines of 350 hp. It was to cost 1,000,000 guilders, i.e. 200,000 more than the Djambi-class corvettes, which was the corvette type under construction since 1858. The name kuilkorvet was probably meant to be very exact, i.e. expressing that the only difference from the previous corvettes would be its covered gun deck. However, the feature 'covered gun deck' was also what traditionally made a ship a frigate. That is, when it was also ship rigged and large enough. This would give people an opportunity to call Huyssen van Kattendijke's corvette a frigate.

Nevertheless, Huyssen van Kattendijke would have to wait some years before he could start to build according to his ideas. When he was appointed, all slipways were occupied. Soon the slipways of the all-important Rijkswerf Amsterdam would be out of order due to a renovation. Meanwhile, the procurement of steam engines and new artillery (rifled guns and very heavy smooth bore muzzle loaders) would consume a big part of the available funds.

=== The battle of Hampton Roads ===
When the March 1862 Battle of Hampton Roads showed the vulnerability of wooden ships to armored ships, a good part of System 1855 had already been implemented. Four frigates with auxiliary steam power had been commissioned, or were ready enough (Adolf van Nassau) to be commissioned. 8 corvettes, and 18 smaller screw vessels had been commissioned or launched.

The remarkable battle caused the Dutch government to shift its attention to armored ships. In June 1862 a commission recommended not to build any more wooden ships, and to concentrate on armoring existing ships and batteries. One of these ships was the frigate with auxiliary steam power De Ruyter. She was rebuilt as a casemate ironclad, even while she was only 200,000 guilders (of 1,000,000) away from completion as a frigate with auxiliary power. In Vlissingen the government created facilities for armoring ships. It seemed that after Hampton Roads, the Dutch concluded that the time of wooden ship was over.

=== New types of warships ===
After the initial scare, the opinion about the wooden ship changed. It dawned on the Dutch that wooden (i.e. unarmored) ships would remain essential for service in the colonies for years to come. Therefore, construction of wooden ships would have to continue. Now Huyssen van Kattendijke could finally implement his own policy. In September 1863 he still wanted to postpone the construction of new warships, while waiting whether armored or unarmored ships would sail the oceans.

In February 1863 the first of the Watergeus-class sloops was laid down. As a sloop, she was not considered to be a warship. She was just as long as the Djambi's, but a lot faster, and armed with longer range guns. Another ship that the minister announced was a 'fast-sailing transport ship'. This would have a 'covered battery' of 6 30-pounder guns. In times of war it would get 26 of these guns, and serve as a warship in the Indies. Transport ship Java would be just as wide as the Djambi's, but 15 m longer. Java resembled Huyssen van Kattendijke's earlier kuilkorvet, but what is probably more significant is his opinion about the necessity of higher speed. About Watergeus he later said: "The only resemblance between Watergeus and Djambi is their length. Watergeus has nearly the same battery and complement as Reteh (Vesuvius-class sloop), but much higher speed. This is nowadays a crucial aspect for a war vessel". Java would get the machines of the broken up corvette Groningen, so its designed speed is less clear.

== Characteristics of Anna Paulowna class ==
=== Design ===
During the 1862 Parliamentary Inquiry about the Navy, Captain-lieutenant J. Modera sent in a note on 2 April, which was later published. In it, he proposed a kind of frigate smaller than the Evertsen-class frigates. He called it a frigate 2nd class, but noted that others might call it a big corvette. It would have less draught than the existing steam frigates, and would therefore be eligible to be built in Amsterdam. The length would be limited to that allowed by the Noordhollandsch Kanaal, but otherwise it would be able to leave the shipyard over the Zuiderzee if empty. The type would have about 28 guns on the main gun deck: 18-20 SBML 30-pounder No. 4, and 10-8 grenade guns of 20 cm No. 2. A total of 4 smaller 30-pounders were envisioned fore and aft on the upper deck as chase guns. Complement would be 340 men, and cost 900,000 guilders. Modera proposed to equip half of his frigates with a 400 hp engine, and the other half with 800 hp engines. The latter would cost about 290,000 guilders more.

After the first ship of the Anna Paulowna class had been laid down in July 1864, the Minister of the Navy explained some more in September. The ship had been designed in accordance with his earlier opinions. It was to be able to communicate with the Dutch East Indies even in times of war, and would have a draft shallow enough to reach the main Dutch navy base at Surabaya. She would therefore have heavy engines (600 hp nominal) and heavy armament (rifled muzzle loaders).

In November 1864 the minister of the navy again tried to explain that Anna Paulowna was a fast light frigate: The Van Galen differs from the existing steam frigates by having 300 men instead of 500 men, and 20 guns instead of 50, and 600 hp instead of 450 hp. That is, Van Galen will have full steam power, while the existing steam frigates have only auxiliary steam power. Furthermore, its draft will be only 19 feet instead of 22 feet for the existing steam frigates.

=== Dimensions ===
The dimensions of the Anna Paulowna class were given by Tideman as length 80.00 m, beam 13.30 m, draft 6.20 m, displacement 3,398t. Design drawings give a shorter length of 76.00 m, and a beam of 13.00 m. The difference is that the 76.00 m is a length between perpendiculars, while Tideman included the part of the hull after the screw, where the rudder was connected (roersteven). Likewise Tideman gave the beam including the hull, while the design measured the beam inside the hull. It is not known whether the displacement given by Tideman was as designed, or from its completion as a training ship.

The length made Anna Paulowna the longest ship in the Dutch Navy for some years. On the other hand, the three preceding frigates with auxiliary steam power were much wider. Adolf van Nassau had a beam of 15.72 m. Their draft was also deeper, 6.80 m versus 6.20 m for the Anna Paulowna class. This comparison reflects the ideas behind the design. The steam frigate had to be fast, and this could only be achieved by having a long narrow hull.

It was clear that with its length, the Anna Paulowna class could not get from Amsterdam to sea via the Noordhollandsch Kanaal. The most restrictive obstacle would be Purmerend Lock, which was 56.86-65.41 m long. It was thought that in time either the opening of the North Sea Canal or improvements of the Noordhollandsch Kanaal would make it possible for the class to easily reach the sea. Meanwhile, it would have to cross the Zuiderzee while empty, and be finished in Willemsoord.

=== Armament ===
During construction the armament of the class was given as 20 pieces of heavy ordnance. This was a lower number than in the previous designs and plans. In September 1864 the plan was that 8 of these 20 guns would be steel rifled muzzle loading (RML) guns. The only steel RML the Dutch were acquiring at the time was the RML 16 cm No. 1. This weighed about as much as the 30-pounder smooth bore muzzle loader (SBML) no. 4., but was a far more effective weapon. It clearly outclassed any SBML, even the heaviest 60-pounder SBML guns.

=== Propulsion ===
The Anna Paulowna class was planned to get machines of 600 nominal horsepower. In the design machinery and boilers were below the waterline.

In October 1868 the engines of Anna Paulowna were tested near Nieuwediep. With 4 out of 6 boilers she made 10.5 knots.

== Ships in the class ==
Both ships were built by the Rijkswerf Amsterdam.

The naming history of the class is very complex: On 21 July 1864, the first ship of the class was laid down as Van Galen. On 16 June 1865, a second ship, Anna Paulowna was laid down. In February 1866 both Van Galen and Anna Paulowna were under construction on the slipway. On 1 June 1866 Pels Rijcken became Minister of the Navy. He obtained a dramatic increase of the navy budget in order to buy an armored fleet. On the other hand, he also almost immediately halted the construction of Anna Paulowna, the second ship of the class.

The above left only Van Galen under construction. In March 1867 the navy wanted to complete Van Galen. On 20 March 1867 Van Galen was rechristened Anna Paulowna, and launched a few hours later. From what happened next it seems that the old Anna Paulowna was then renamed Van Galen, but that does not matter that much.

That two ships exchanged names was not that peculiar, but now something really strange happened. After Anna Paulowna (ex-Van Galen) was launched, the hull of Van Galen (ex-Anna Paulowna) was renamed Zilveren Kruis on 11 April 1867. Therefore, Van Galen (ex-Anna Paulowna) had obviously remained on the slipway after construction had been halted almost a year earlier. In February 1867 the secretary for the navy had mentioned that Anna Paulowna could perhaps be made into a somewhat altered Djambi, especially because the wood that had been used would otherwise go to waste. In September 1867, there was an announcement that the 'Van Galen type' ship that had been laid down earlier, would not be finished, but that later in 1867 a 'changed type Djambi' would be laid down. The name would be Zilveren Kruis, and its construction would include the scantlings of the ship that had been laid down earlier. This was not as weird as it seems, because the beam of these ships was 13.30 m for the Anna Paulowna class vs. 12.75 m for the Zilveren Kruis class.

In the same message that announced that Zilveren Kruis would be laid down again later in 1867, the Minister of the Navy also announced that in 1868, a second 'changed type Djambi' would be laid down. This was a new Van Galen, laid down on 19 February 1868

Name	Laid down	Launched	Commissioned	Fate
Anna Paulowna (ex-Van Galen)	21 July 1864	20 March 1867	6 December 1877 as Training Ship	
Zilveren Kruis (ex-Van Galen) (ex-Anna Paulowna)	16 June 1865	N/a changed to a Zilveren Kruis corvette	As corvette	
