= Watergeus-class sloop =

Netherlands class of warships

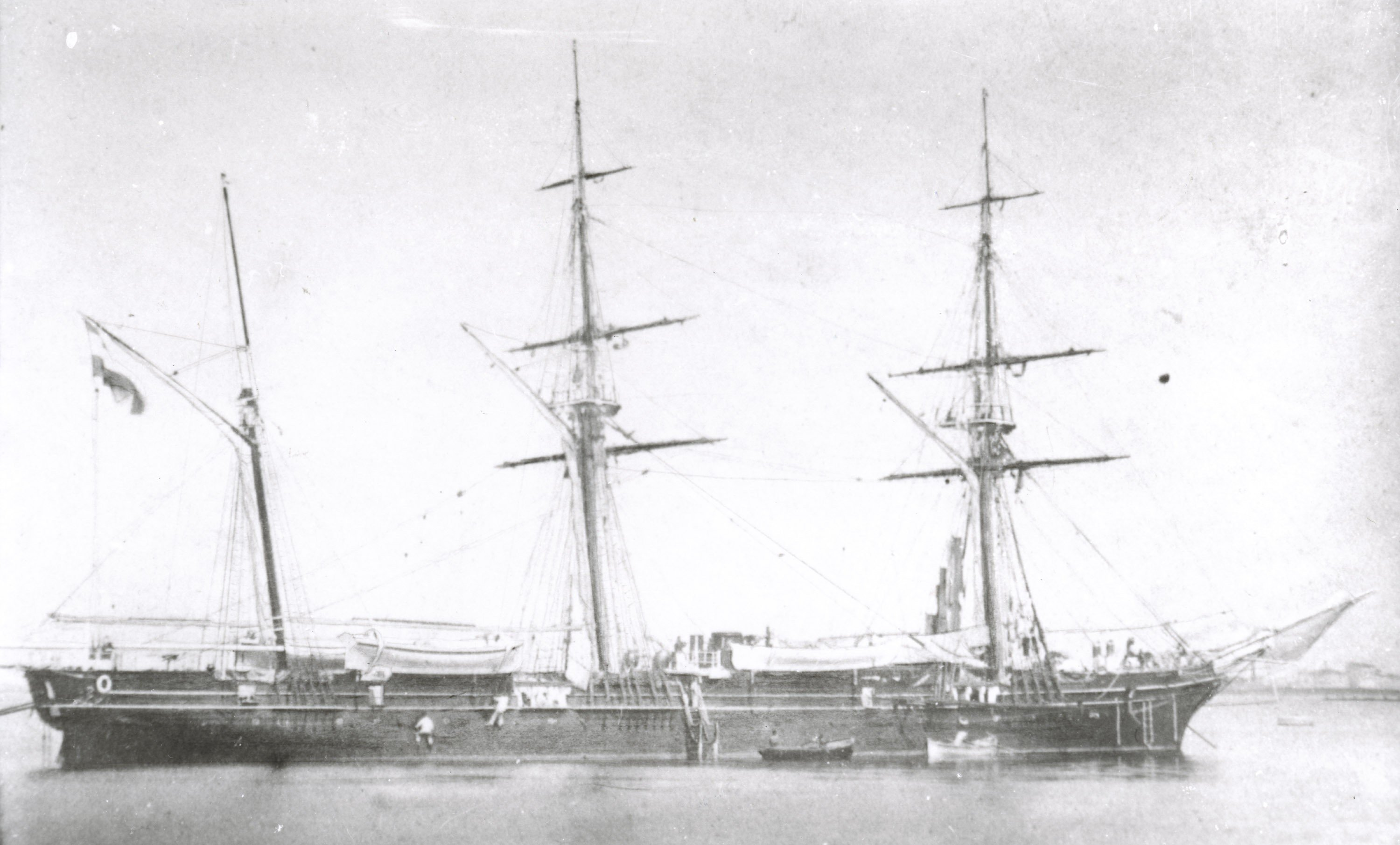
- The Marnix of the Watergeus class

Class overview
- Name: Watergeus class
- Builders: Rijkswerf Amsterdam
- Operators: Royal Netherlands Navy
- Planned: 3
- Completed: 2
- Canceled: 1

General characteristics
- Type: screw sloop-of-war
- Displacement: 1.405 tons
- Length: 58.00 m (190 ft 3 in)
- Beam: 9.74 m (31 ft 11 in)
- Draught: 4.90 m (16 ft 1 in)
- Installed power: 280 nominal horsepower; 770 indicated horsepower (570 kW)
- Speed: 10 knots (19 km/h)
- Complement: 130 (149-175 in Dutch East Indies)
- Armament: Watergeus: 2 x RML 16 cm No. 1; 4 x RML 16 cm No. 3; Marnix: 2 x RML 7-inch Armstrong Gun; 2 x RML 16 cm No. 3
- Armour: ship made of wood

The Watergeus class was a class of screw sloop-of-war of the Royal Netherlands Navy. The class comprised the 'Watergeus' and the Marnix. A third ship that had been planned was cancelled.

== Dutch Naval Plans in the 1860s ==
=== The Secretary for the navy inherits a construction plan ===
The career officer Willem Huyssen van Kattendijke became Secretary for the navy on 14 March 1861. He of course inherited the ship-building program of his predecessor Mr. J.S. Lotsy, secretary for the navy from 1 August 1856 till 14 March 1861. This severely limited the new secretary's options for the East Indies. He first had to finish all 6 of the Djambi's laid down by his predecessor, before he could start to execute his own plans.

Huyssen van Kattendijke was quite negative about the Djambi's as heaviest ships in the Dutch East Indies. While he admitted that steam frigates of 500 men were too costly, he thought that only ships that had their guns below decks (the 'kuilschip') were real warships. He therefore proposed a heavy steam corvette with 22 guns below-decks, 350 nominal horse power, 250 men, a draught of no more than 20 feet, and costing about 1,000,000 guilders, i.e. 200,000 more than a Djambi. It would be able to execute most of the tasks required in Europe and in the Indies.

=== 1862: Battle of Hampton Roads ===
The March 1862 Battle of Hampton Roads saw an armored confederate ship easily sinking two Union frigates. It put a temporary end to the secretary's plan to build a significant number of heavy corvettes. Building armored ships would be a logical alternative, but the Dutch industry first had to build a capability to do so.

In late 1862 an important report (enquete) mentioned that the 'steamships third class' like the Reteh and Vesuvius (both of the Vesuvius class) were suitable for service in the Dutch East Indies. In late 1863 the secretary announced that he had started the construction of an 'improved Reteh'. To be on the safe side, only one ship would be built at first.

== Design ==
The Watergeus was initially supposed to be an 'improved Reteh'. She would be laid down as a 'Schroefstoomschip 4de klasse'. Later on, it would be described as modeled on the CSS Alabama. The dimensions of the ship support this. The length between perpendiculars of the Reteh was 45.5 m, the Watergeus 58.0 m, the Alabama 65.2m (213.8 feet). The name Watergeus gives further support to this belief. The Geuzen were buccaneers like the crew of the Alabama. The second ship was named for Philips of Marnix, Lord of Saint-Aldegonde a person closely associated with the Geuzen.

Classification of the Watergeus as a screw sloop-of-war has to do with the rigging of the ship. In the Netherlands as well as in England, only ships with full rigging on all three masts were called ships, and the smallest of these were called corvettes. Watergeus had three masts, but with only Fore-and-aft rig on the mizzen mast. In English this made the Watergeus a sloop-of-war, the ship category right below the corvette.

== Propulsion ==
The Watergeus class had machines of 280 nominal horsepower made by Van Vlissingen en Dudok van Heel in Amsterdam. When the Dutch shifted to using indicated horse power, the machines were measured at 770 indicated horse power. The difference is due to nominal horse power not taking steam pressure into account. Therefore indicated horse power is a better measure.

The Watergeus had a displacement of 1,405 tons as opposed to the 2,030 tons of the Djambi class. It had somewhat more power, and an equal length. The Watergeus class attained a maximum speed of 12 knots on her trials 10 years later, in 1875 she was registered as making 10 knots maximum

== Armament ==
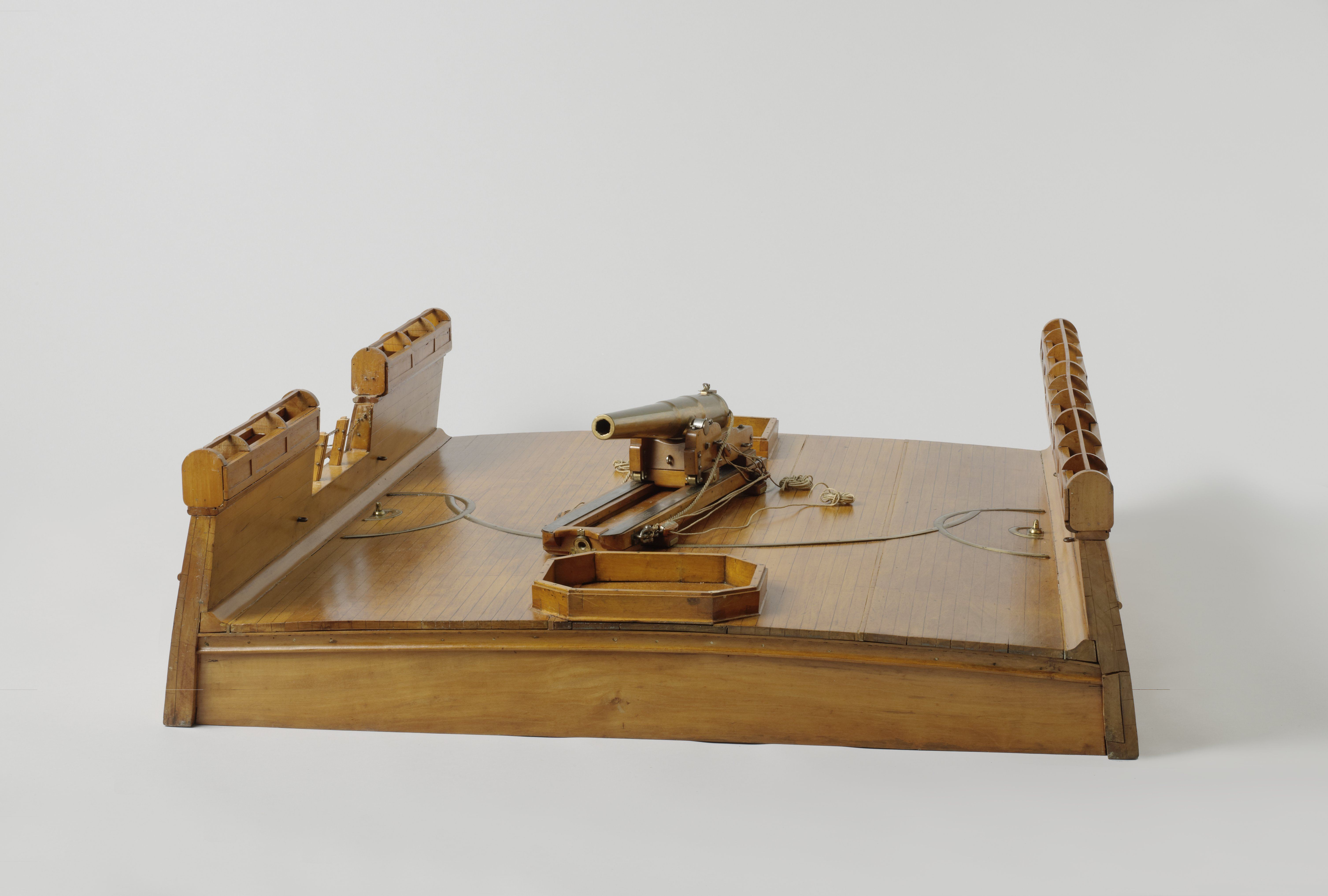
RML 16 cm No. 1 as placed on Watergeus

The Watergeus class had fewer guns than the preceding Djambi's. However, the guns that they did have were much better. At least two guns on Watergeus were long 16 cm RML's, shooting a 100 pound bullet, placed on pivots between the masts. These long 16 cm guns had been designed especially for Watergeus by De Fremery, Head of Artillery of the Navy. He designed the guns in March 1863, and in 1864, bronze guns of this type were commissioned from the firm of J.J. Maritz in The Hague, and steel guns of the same type from Krupp in Essen, Germany. De Fremery also commissioned a model of the gun as placed on Watergeus. From the dimensions of this model (34 cm long, by 1.6 cm caliber) it can be pinpointed as a 16 cm No. 1, weighing 75% more than the No. 3.

The four other 16 cm guns on the Watergeus were the 'Getrokken Kanon 16 cm No. 3' shooting a 60 pound bullet. These were also present on the Djambi's. Unlike the Djambi's the Watergeus class did not have classic smooth-bore guns.

Marnix was even better armed. It would get two RML 7-inch Armstrong Gun (which each weighed more than twice as much as the RML 16 cm No. 1), and two 'Getrokken Kanon 16 cm No. 3'.

== Construction ==
Of the 3 ships planned, only the Watergeus and Marnix were finished.

Name	Laid down	Launched	Commissioned	Fate
Watergeus	7 Feb 1863	17 June 1864	1 November 1864	
Marnix	1 May 1865	6 June 1867	1 July 1868	
?	Cancelled 1866			
