= Zilveren Kruis-class corvette =

Class of warship in the Netherlands

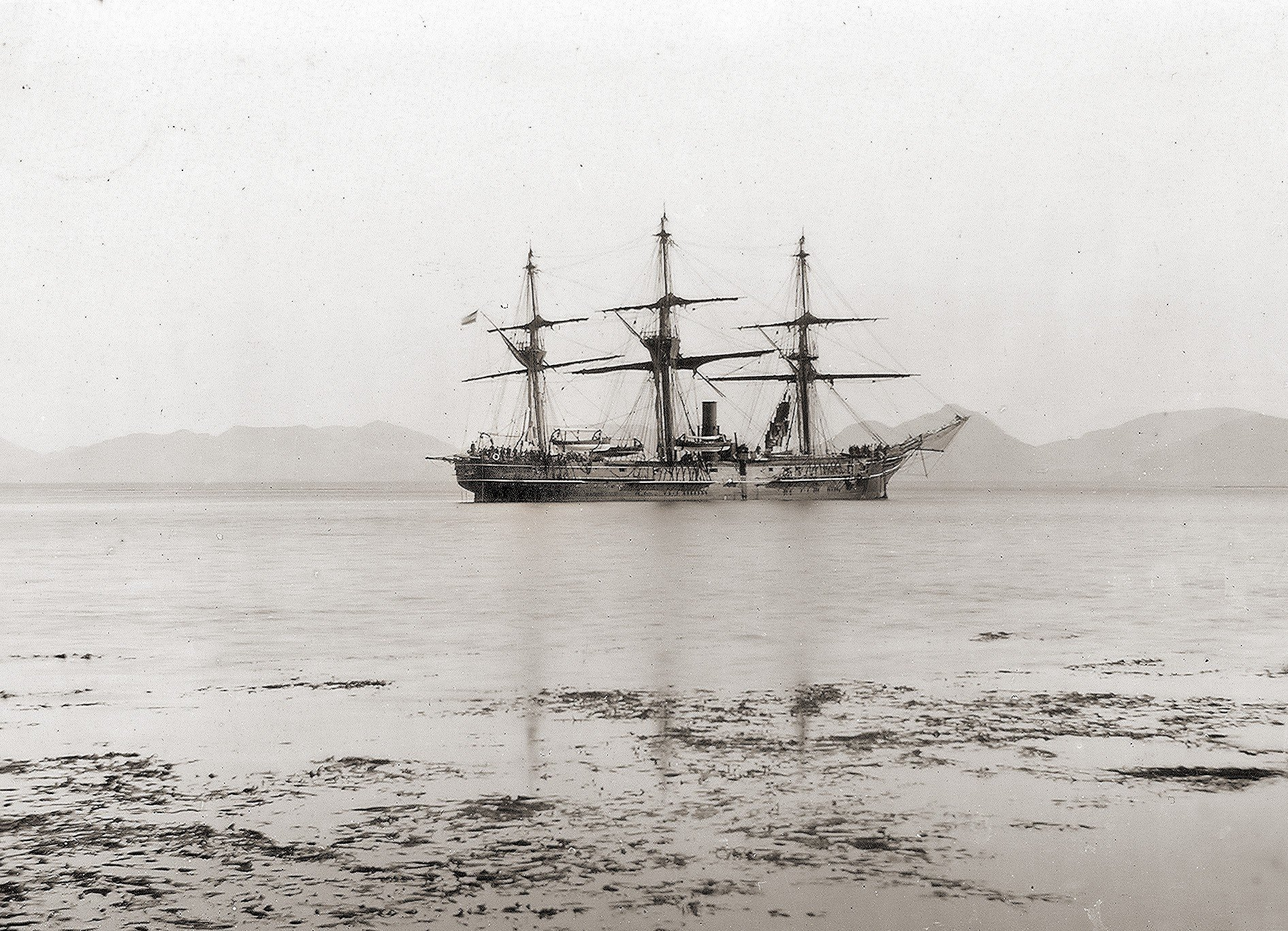
- Zilveren Kruis

Class overview
- Name: Zilveren Kruis class
- Builders: Rijkswerf Amsterdam
- Operators: Royal Netherlands Navy
- Preceded by: Djambi class
- In commission: 1870-1920
- Planned: 2
- Completed: 2
- Scrapped: 2

General characteristics
- Type: Steam corvette
- Displacement: 2,160 tons
- Length: 59.00 m (193 ft 7 in)
- Beam: 12.75 m (41 ft 10 in)
- Draught: 5.50 m (18 ft 1 in)
- Installed power: 280 nhp; 1,480 ihp (1,100 kW)
- Speed: 10.5 knots (19.4 km/h; 12.1 mph)
- Complement: 225
- Armament: 4 × RML 7-inch Armstrong Gun; 8 x 16 cm RML

The Zilveren Kruis class was a class of two steam-powered corvettes of the Royal Netherlands Navy. The class comprised Zilveren Kruis and Van Galen.

== Background ==
The career officer Willem Huyssen van Kattendijke became Secretary for the Navy on 14 March 1861. He wanted to have a fleet centered on screw frigates. The March 1862 Battle of Hampton Roads then showed that these were defenseless against armored ships. It put a temporary an end to plans to build new wooden steam frigates. In the 1864 Shimonoseki Campaign unarmored Dutch ships then performed quite well. It led some to believe that armored ships might not be that important in the colonies.

The secretary for the navy therefore started the first ship of the Anna Paulowna class in 1864. It was supposed to be a class of Kuilkorvetten, a corvette that had its main battery below the upper deck. Later on these would be dubbed as "steam frigates". Considering that their size of 3,398 t made them bigger than most frigates in the Royal Netherlands Navy, this was a better designation. On 1 June 1866 G.C.C. Pels Rijcken became the new secretary for the navy. He made a radical choice to build an armored fleet.

As a consequence of the choice for an armored fleet the new secretary for the navy canceled the Anna Paulowna class and the Watergeus class. This meant that of the former only one ship would be finished, and that the third ship of the Watergeus class would be canceled. In the meantime, many ships of the previous classes that were stationed in the Dutch East Indies would become unfit for service. Therefore, the secretary had to order some new ships. For this he fell back on the design of the Djambi class. He ordered some ships of the type "improved Djambi".

== Characteristics ==
The Zilveren Kruis class were a class of steam corvettes. The official Dutch classification was Schroefstoomschip 1e klas. It translates as "screw steam ship 1st class", and was an administrative designation that could be changed as other types of screw steamships (dis)appeared. The Zilveren Kruis was the last class of wooden corvettes that the Dutch navy would build.

=== An improved Djambi ===
The Zilveren Kruis class was based on the design of the Djambi class. The Zilveren Kruis class was therefore also called "type Djambi", or more often "type improved Djambi". There were some very solid reasons to do this. Naval Secretary Lotsy had ordered the construction of the Djambis. His successor Huyssen van Kattendijke had stopped the Djambi program and started the Anna Paulowna and Watergeus classes. When Pels Rijcken succeeded to the office it was obvious that he would not make himself popular if he started yet another type of ship.

The discontinuation of the Djambi class by Huyssen van Kattendijke alone is enough to classify the Zilveren Kruis as a separate (sub)class of ships. A closer look at the Zilveren Kruis' armament and propulsion shows a clear difference between the classes. While the Djambi was outrun and outgunned by English steam corvettes, the same could not be said about the Zilveren Kruis. Her propulsion and armament were almost in line with the ships of the Great Powers. In 1873 an anonymous writer stated:

The screw steam ships 1st class, type 'Zilveren Kruis' are excellent sailing ships, and good steamers. They are heavily armed, and have a medium sized crew of 225 men. All these characteristics make them very suitable to represent the Netherlands on all seas of the world. Composite construction would be very desirable for these kind of ships.

=== Dimensions ===
The Zilveren Kruis class was 59 meters (193 ft 7 in) long, one meter (3 ft 3 in) longer than the Djambi class. The draft of 5.5 m (18 ft 1 in) was the same, but had more to do with being able to enter the harbor at Surabaya in all tides. The width was 0.5 m (1 ft 8 in) wider, probably to prevent the problems the Djambi had with having enough space to use her guns. With 2,160 t vs 2,030 t the Zilveren Kruis class was not that much larger than the Djambis.

=== Propulsion ===
The first real improvement that the Zilveren Kruis brought was in its machinery. With 280 nominal horsepower Zilveren Kruis had only 30 nominal horsepower more than the Djambi or the Vice-Admiral Koopman class. In indicated horsepower however, the difference was dramatic: 1,480 ihp (1,100 kW) verus 700 ihp (520 kW). The effect was that the Zilveren Kruis had a maximum speed of 10.5 knots (19.4 km/h; 12.1 mph), two knots (3.7 km/h; 2.3 mph) more than the Djambi.

This success came at a price for the factory Van Vlissingen en Dudok van Heel, later Koninklijke Fabriek van Stoom- en andere Werktuigen. While testing the machine, the screw did not achieve the projected number of turns per minute. The Zilveren Kruis did attain the designed speed, but the factory was nevertheless forced to pay a fine of 22,000 guilders When a machine for the Van Galen had to be acquired, the navy decided to transplant the machines of the Zoutman. This brought the speed of Van Galen down to the 8.5 knots (15.7 km/h; 9.8 mph) of the Djambis.

=== Armament ===
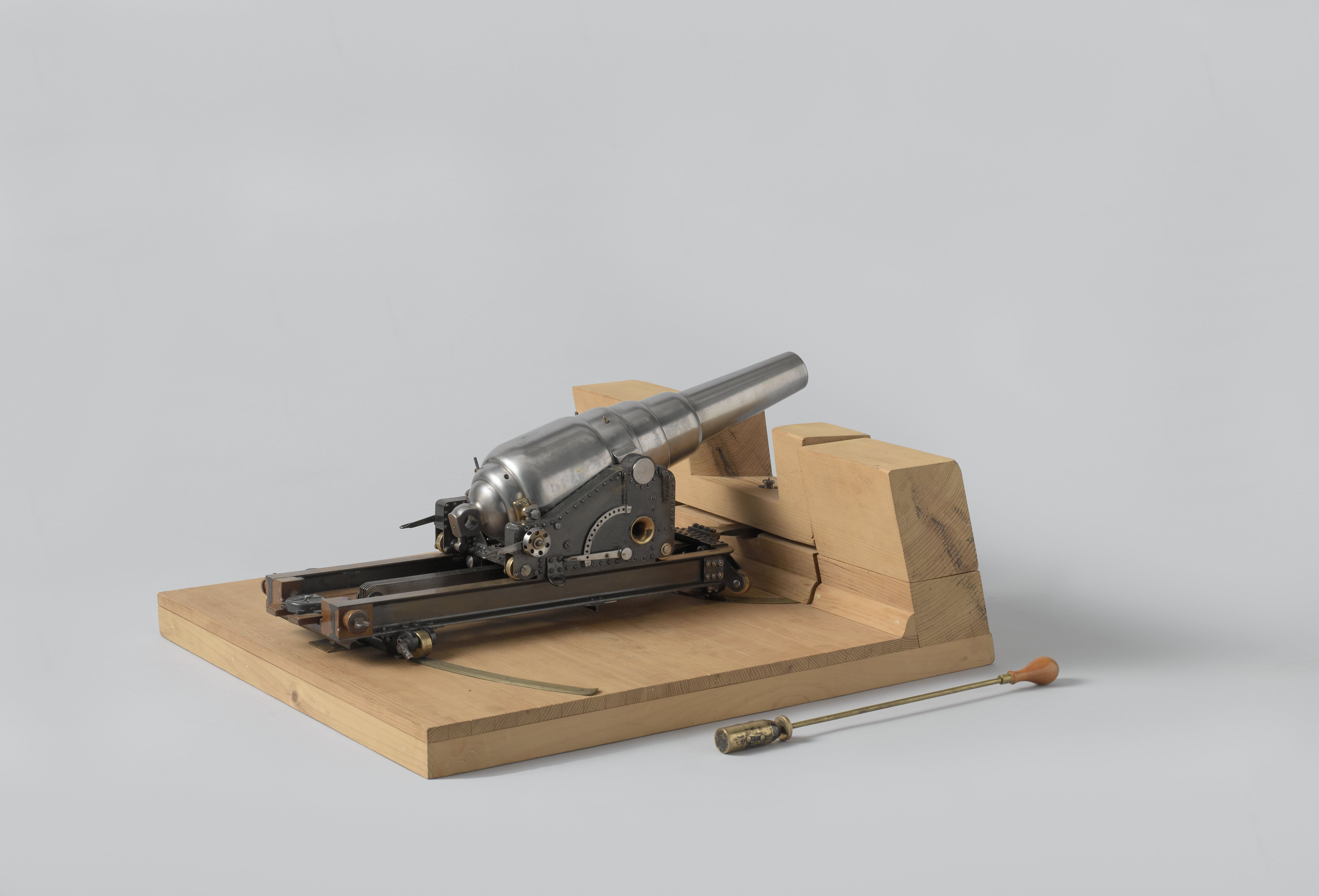
Model of 18 cm RML on Zilveren Kruis

The Zilveren Kruis class was armed with four Armstrong 18 cm RML guns, and eight rifled muzzle loaders of 16 cm. The 18 cm (7.1 in) guns were positioned aft on pivots. The 16 cm (6.3 in) guns more forward. The 18 cm Armstrong guns were able to penetrate armored ships. For the 16 cm guns this was rather doubtful.

The arms of the Zilveren Kruis were later replaced. When she was retired in October 1888 she had ten 12 cm breech loaders. Van Galen also started with four Armstrong 18 cm RMLs, and eight rifled muzzle loaders of 16 cm.

== Construction ==
Both ships were built at the Rijkswerf in Amsterdam.

=== Zilveren Kruis ===
The Zilveren Kruis was laid down on 18 June 1865 as the Anna Paulowna, the second ship of the Anna Paulowna class. In July 1865, the Anna Paulowna was mentioned as being 80 m (262 ft 6 in) long. In the first half of 1866, the construction of the Anna Paulowna was stopped. In February 1867 the secretary for the navy mentioned that the Anna Paulowna could perhaps be made into a somewhat altered Djambi, especially because the wood that had been used would otherwise go to waste.

On 20 March 1867, the name of the first ship of the Anna Paulowna class, that is the Van Galen, was changed to 'Anna Paulowna', before the ship was launched at Amsterdam. On 11 April 1867 the second ship of the Anna Paulowna class was renamed to Zilveren Kruis In September 1867, there was an announcement that the "Van Galen type ship" that had been laid down earlier, would not be finished, but that later in 1867 a "changed type Djambi" would be laid down. The name would be Zilveren Kruis, and its construction would include the scantlings of the ship that had been laid down earlier. The re-use of the scantlings is in line with the earlier story. As yet there is no confirmation of a new Zilveren Kruis being laid down in late 1867.

On 18 June 1869, the Zilveren Kruis was launched. On 21 August 1870 she was commissioned.

== Ships in class ==
Name	Laid down	Launched	Commissioned	Fate
Zilveren Kruis	18 June 1865	18 June 1869	21 August 1870	declared not seaworthy 19 October 1888
Van Galen	19 February 1868	9 July 1872	1 April 1876	sold 28 Jan 1920
