= HNLMS Djambi =

Lead ship of Djambi-class

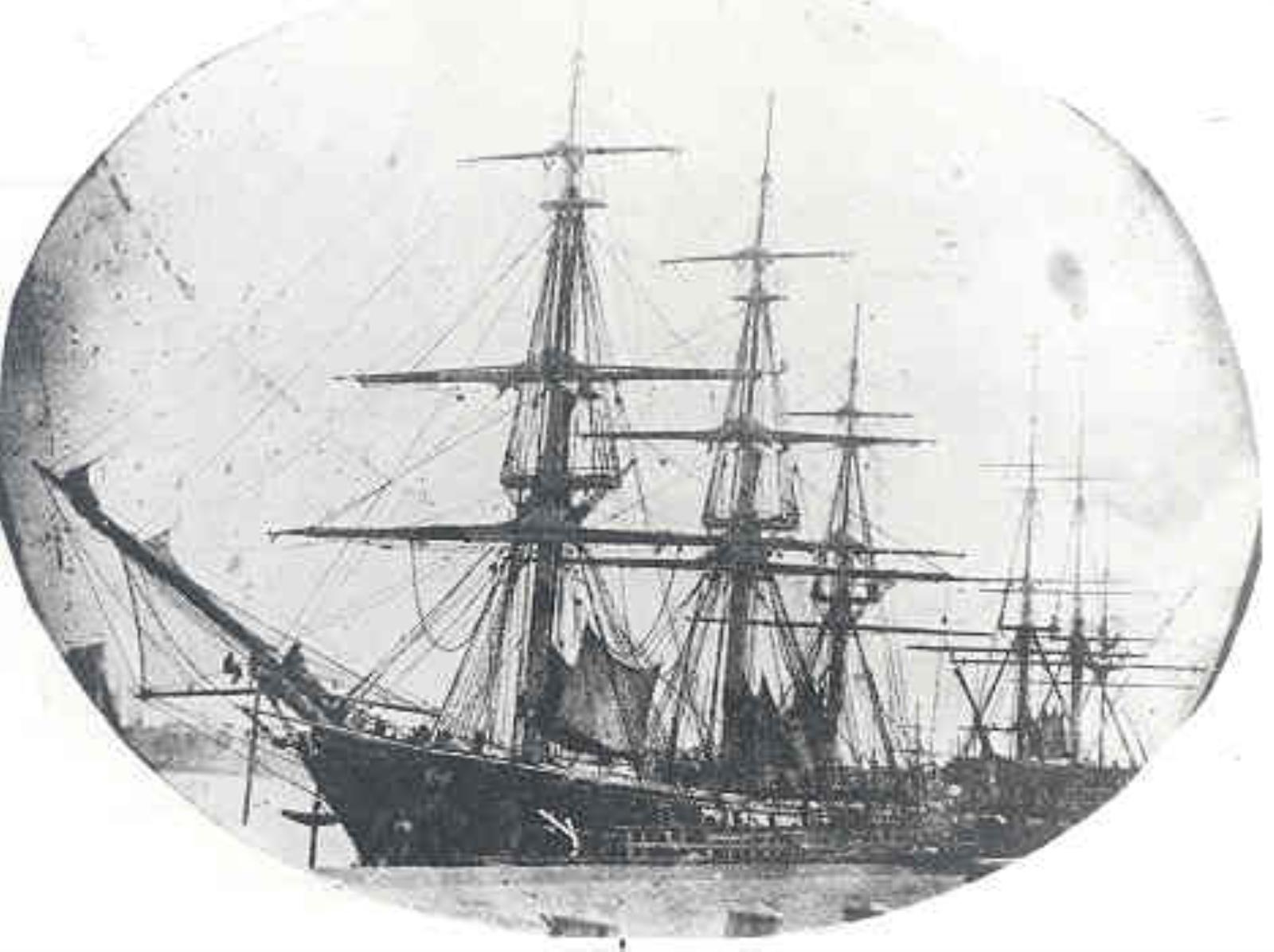
- The Djambi

History

Netherlands
- Name: Djambi
- Namesake: Conquest of Jambi
- Builder: Rijkswerf Amsterdam
- Laid down: 29 December 1858
- Launched: 31 October 1860
- Commissioned: 1 June 1861
- Out of service: 9 April 1874

General characteristics (as completed)
- Class & type: Djambi-class Steam Corvette
- Displacement: 2,030 long tons (2,060 t)
- Length: 62.84 m (206.2 ft) (length p/p)
- Beam: 12.25 m (40.2 ft)
- Draft: 5.50 m (18.0 ft)
- Installed power: 700 ihp (520 kW)
- Speed: 8.5 knots (15.7 km/h; 9.8 mph)
- Complement: 225
- Armament: 8 * RML 16 cm No. 3 and; 8 * SBML 30 Pdr No 4
- Armour: none

HNLMS Djambi was the lead ship of the Djambi-class, built for the Royal Netherlands Navy from the late 1850s. She was in the 1864 Shimonoseki affair and in the 1873 First Aceh Expedition. She became unfit for service after serving for only 13 years.

== Construction and commissioning ==
On 1 December 1858, the Dutch government determined that the next screw steamship first class to be built at the Rijkswerf in Amsterdam would be named Djambi in order to remember the recent war in the area of Jambi. Djambi was laid down on 29 December 1858. On 31 October 1860, the screw steamship second class Djambi was launched in Amsterdam. On 3 December 1860, there was a call for bids to supply ironwork for Djambi. On 26 April 1861 the machines of the screw steamship first class Djambi were tested in Amsterdam. They had been made by the NSBM in Rotterdam. The ship would leave for Nieuwediep on the 30th to get its rigging and other equipment. On 1 June 1861, Djambi was put into service at Nieuwediep under the command of Captain-lt Marin Henri Jansen, known as author of De omwenteling in het zeewezen and other naval works.

== Campaign in the West Indies ==
When the American Civil War started, the Dutch wanted to stay neutral and protect their shipping. Therefore, a squadron consisting of the screw frigate Zeeland and screw steamships Djambi and Vesuvius was formed. It was to go to the West Indies and join the screw steamship Cornelis Dirks and the schooner Atalante, which were already in Curaçao. Not everything went according to plan. At first Djambi's departure was postponed to 1 July. In the end it was 17 July 1861 when Djambi sailed for the West Indies by herself. On 3 September Djambi arrived in Suriname. On 7 October 1861 the Zeeland, Cornelis Dirks, Vesuvius, Djambi and Atalante were all anchored before Curaçao. Except for the Zeeland, the squadron then went on a cruise to show the Venezuelans that they were present. On 5 January 1862 the squadron was in Curaçao. A few days later Djambi left to visit Sint Eustatius. Saint Martin, Saba, Martinique and Saint Croix. After the affair with Venezuela was terminated, the ships could return to Europe. On 22 June the squadron lay ready to sail in the harbor of Curaçao. On 1 August Djambi left the West Indies. On 7 September 1862 she arrived back in Nieuwediep.

=== Dry dock disaster in Willemsoord ===
Djambi's next voyage would be to the East Indies. In September 1862 she was planned to be the first ship to use the new Willemsoord Dry Dock II in Willemsoord. While workmen were preparing for her entrance, the bottom of the dock suddenly ripped open, causing enormous damage. The next plan was to have the sailing frigate Alexander leave the old Willemsoord Dry Dock I on 6 October so Djambi could enter. This happened on 10 October.

== Voyage to Australia ==
=== The visit to Australia is planned ===
While Djambi was still in the West Indies, the plan for a friendly visit to Australia became known over there. In January 1862 the Dutch consulate in Sydney got letters that Djambi would visit to Australia. Port Jackson, Sydney would be the first port of call.

=== Captain-lt van Rees takes command ===
On 20 October 1862 Captain-lt P.A. van Rees would take command of Djambi. On 28 October the transport ship Heldin returned to Nieuwediep. It had to be inspected, and rumors were that its cargo (including 30 30-pounders of the new model) would be transferred to Djambi and Apeldoorn.

=== Saves the schooner Orlando ===
After some delay Djambi left from Texel on 18 December 1862. Shortly after, there was a fierce gale. Many feared for the ship, and the fact that it sailed led to a row. On 22 December Van Rees sent a message that all was well from the entrance of the Channel. With much trouble Djambi had saved the dismasted English Schooner Orlando by towing it from Hinder Bank to Dover Roads. In the evening of 23 December Djambi anchored at Spithead. In a storm on 19 and 20 December she had lost sails, an anchor and chain, as well as sustaining damage to boats, stove and machines. In March 1863 the British Government would send a telescope as a gift to Van Rees.

=== From Portsmouth to Australia ===
During the last days of 1862 Djambi was ordered to dock in Portsmouth. The damage to the ship was repaired quickly, and on 14 January 1863 she continued her journey to Montevideo. On 13 February Djambi arrived in Rio de Janeiro after a very good journey. She left Rio on the 20th.

=== Albany, Western Australia ===
On 6 April Djambi arrived in King George Sound, harbor of Albany, in Western Australia. Djambi saluted the British flag with a 21 shot salute, but was not answered, because Albany did not have any cannon. It now became known that Djambi was on a mission to show the flag in Australia. She would visit Adelaide, Melbourne and Sydney. The stop in King George Sound was primarily meant to put everything in order. On 8 April Djambi fired a salute to honor the birthday of Princess Sophie of the Netherlands. She also fired 130 rounds from her 30-pounder guns for target practice, and bunkered 130 tons of coal from P & O Company. Captain van Rees held a dinner party, and the officers offered a lunch to some of the inhabitants, with music and some dancing afterwards. On 16 April Djambi left Albany.

=== Adelaide, South Australia ===
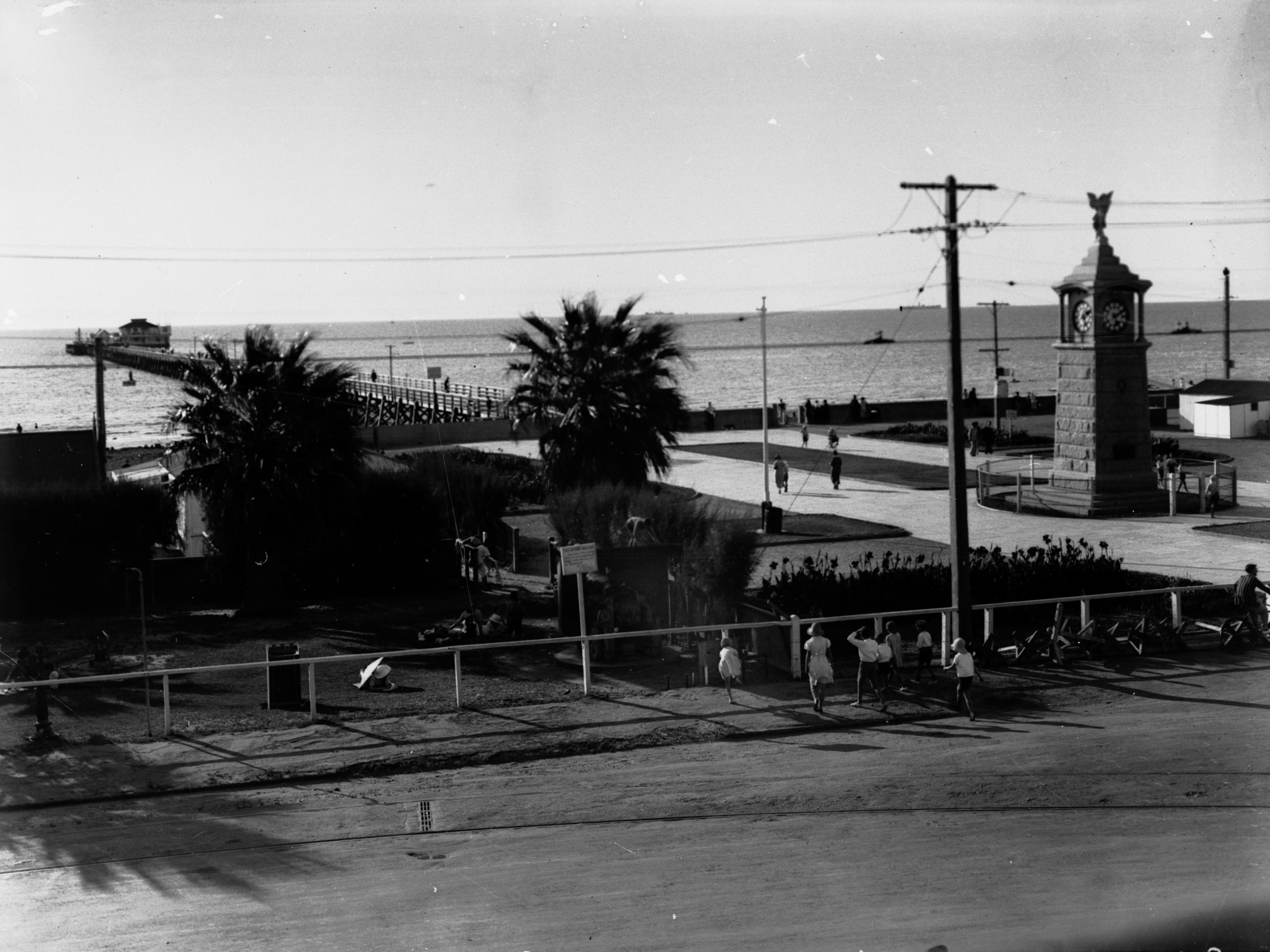
The Semaphore Jetty of Adelaide c 1936

Meanwhile, Adelaide, capital of South Australia was also preparing. Djambi drew too much water to pass the banks and arrive in the harbor proper. She would therefore have to anchor as near as possible to the semaphore jetty. A Dutch flag was ordered, and Adelaide began to look for a battery that could return the salute of Djambi. The Port Adelaide volunteer artillery was the logical candidate to give this salute. A few months before Captain Simpson and several of the NCO's and privates had resigned. Other members then started a recruitment campaign. By the time of the visit of Djambi, the company was commanded by Captain Quinn, and had 30 members, half of them recruits. On 16 April two six-pounder field guns and ammunition were brought from the town to the beach, and placed in a gun shed. This would on the Sandhills near the Flagstaff. The goal was to salute Djambi as soon as she would reach the semaphore. Therefore, a sharp lookout was established on the stations on the 20th.

In the morning of Saturday 25 April the lookout observed smoke to South West by West. She was soon identified as Djambi, and was under steam only. She sailed straight to the lightship, and after taking on a pilot, she continued and anchored about 2.5 miles from the Semaphore jetty in five fathoms of water. As soon as the anchor had been lowered, a British flag was hoisted in the main mast, and a salute of 21 shots was fired. It was answered by the government flagstaff on shore hoisting a Dutch flag. Soon followed by the Port Adelaide volunteer artillery returning the salute with her field pieces, even though these were hardly heard on board Djambi because of the western wind. A black gig with a pennant and red ensign appeared. She had been borrowed from Yatala, and was rowed by four neatly arranged men. On board were the Dutch Consul Mr. F.S. Dutton M.P., and Captain Douglas, naval officer of South Australia. They were received by Commander van Rees, and given a brief tour of the ship. On leaving they received a salute of nine shots. Later that day the Mayor of Adelaide and the Mayor of Port Adelaide visited. That day a third visit was made by Captain Quinn and the volunteer artillery. Djambi now first needed to bunker, and so the ship was not open to the public till Wednesday 29 April. However, a short description was given to the public:

(Djambi is) a fine specimen of naval architecture, though not perhaps one of the modern school. The Djambi is a vessel such as would rate in the British navy as an 18-gun frigate, and though said to be but 1,200 tons register, she looks very much larger than any ship we have had here for many years, and especially when boarding her is this the case, for having a flush deck fore and aft, the extreme dimensions over all are taken at a glance, which from the bridge is to the uninitiated, very imposing, as there are six 30-pounders and two rifled 60-pounders on each side, while on the bridge are two pieces of ordnance of lower caliber. Having a fine breadth or beam, her spars are in proportion, indeed from end to end there is a massiveness about her gear rather differing from the usual appointments of visitors over our waters. The only obstruction on deck is the galley and funnel, which is a huge telescopic affair that may be elevated half way to the main-top, but when not required diminishes until but a limited height above the hammock settings. There is a kind of hurricane house aft, which forms a wheel house and armory, and a portion of it is set aside as a flag-locker. The state cabin is directly before the mizzen-mast and the fore-side of that is the midshipmen's berth: then the 'tween decks forward furnishes quarters for the crew, who, with marines, make a total of 223 men. In her appointments there is no extraneous ornamentation, everything being suited more for utility than display, and in some instances there are evidences of her being astern in the march of improvement.(follows description of the voyage to Adelaide)

— South Australian Advertiser, 27 April 1863

On Tuesday 28 Djambi was busy bunkering the whole day. In the evening some officers visited the Adelaider Liedertafel, where there was singing in German, which was especially liked by the surgeon T.F. Kluge. On Wednesday the ship was cleaned for the public. On Wednesday evening Commander van Rees and Mr Brieder M.D. dined at Captain Hart's. On Thursday 30 April many ladies and gentlemen visited Djambi, which was open from stem to stern. In the evening all officers were on shore.

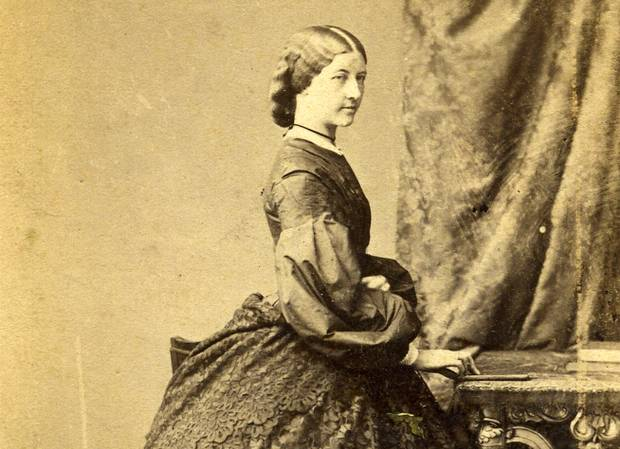
The artist Caroline Louisa Daly, daughter of the governor visited Djambi

Saturday 2 May 1863 was a big day for Djambi. The Governor of South Australia, Dominick Daly came to visit her. He was accompanied by his daughters (he had two: Joanna and Caroline, both married in 1866), other family and some dignitaries, and came by way of the Semaphore Jetty. The steam vessel Young Australian arrived from the wharf with the rest of the party, which consisted of the consuls of various nations, the Speaker of the House of Assembly, the Attorney General etc. etc. as well as the band of the First Adelaide Rifles for some music during the 1.5 hours trip. On board an awning with sides had been spanned over the rear half of the ship, enclosing the space, which had been decorated with flags and flowers. Another awning was over the fore part of the ship. After an inspection of the ship there were waltzes and quadrilles until refreshments were announced. Some heavy rain then put an end to dancing, and instead some sailors sang their favorite songs. A very ample lunch followed, with gunfire and mutual toasts to the health of the visitors and hosts. At 6 o'clock the visitors left while the yards of Djambi were manned.

On Sunday Djambi was again visited by many people, primarily consisting of mechanics and people from the working classes. On Monday 4 May half the crew of Djambi would visit the copper mines and smelting works at Kapunda by train, accompanied by their officers. On Tuesday the other half of the crew would follow. Tickets were paid by the South Australian government. At three o'clock in the afternoon of Monday 4 May Commander van Rees was present while the foundation stone for Adelaide Town Hall was laid. Next all dignitaries celebrated this event with a collation with many toasts in the council chamber. In the evening the Chief Secretary George Waterhouse, Premier of South Australia gave a big dinner at Parliament House. Invitees were the governor, all members of both houses, the lord bishop, the heads of the departments etc. etc. and the commander and officers of Djambi. Of course there were the usual toasts to the Queen of Great Britain and the King of the Netherlands.

On Tuesday 5 May there was a subscription ball organized by a committee the inhabitants of Adelaide. It was a splendid affair with almost 300 guests, including governor J.G. Daly and family. Captain van Rees and 14 officers arrived in uniform. Several members of the government and many MP's were present, as well as the mayor and several dignitaries. The venue was the Adelaide Assembly Rooms, which were lavishly decorated. Chapman's band provided the music, and there was also a supper. It was a grand affair for Adelaide. On 7 May Djambi left Adelaide for Melbourne.

=== Melbourne and Sydney ===
On 10 May 1863 Djambi arrived in Melbourne. On 12 May the captain and officers were at a large diner party given by the Dutch Consul mr. Ploos van Amstel. The next day the captain, officers and consul visited the governor. On the 20th Governor Barkly and his wife, the consul and some others were invited for lunch on board by Commander van Rees. On the 21st there was a ball with over 500 guests in St. George's Hall. Djambi next continued to Sydney, where the officers dined on 30 May. On 6 June the governor and other dignitaries visited Djambi. On 8 June there was a ball. On 20 June Djambi left Sidney for Batavia.

== First East Indies Campaign ==
=== To Japan ===
On 23 July 1863 Djambi arrived in Batavia. On 12 August she left Batavia, obviously to go to Surabaya where she was being repaired in late August. On 13 September Djambi left Surabaya, and she arrived back in Batavia on 17 September. In 1863 there was a lot of tension between Japan and western powers about opening the country to foreign trade. After some rumors had circulated, Djambi left Batavia for Japan on 26 September 1863. The commander would try to sail most of the way from Batavia to Nagasaki, but would be forced to use the engines due to many head winds. On 7 October Djambi arrived in Hong Kong to bunker. She left for Nagasaki on 14 October, arriving there on the 26th. The first action for Van Rees would be to contact the Medusa, and to take command of all the Dutch ships in Japan, meaning the Medusa, which was in Yokohama. On 11 November the Medusa arrived in Nagasaki, and after Van Rees took overall command of the ships, Djambi continued to Yokohama. Both ships were primarily meant to protect trade interests and Dutch citizens.

=== The Straits of Shimonoseki ===
On 25 February 1864, Rutherford Alcock the British minister to Japan, arrived in Nagasaki on the warship Argus. He had orders to open the Straits of Shimonoseki, which had been kept closed to foreign shipping by the Chōshū clan. On 15 May both the Medusa and Djambi were in Yokohama, waiting for the Metalen Kruis (which would arrive 28 June) and the steam paddle ship Amsterdam (which would arrive 4 July). On 20 May the British first rate ship of the line Conqueror arrived with 588 marines.

After this fleet had been assembled the forces of the United Kingdom, the Netherlands, France and the United States were brought under the command of English Vice-Admiral Kuper. In mid-July the English warships Barossa and Cormorant were sent to hand the Chōshū clan an ultimatum. Djambi was to be part of this mission, but at the last moment this was changed. Instead a Dutch officer and a French officer were on board the English ships. After it became clear that the Chōshū would not give in to the ultimatum, military action was planned. Captain-lt van Rees of Djambi was chosen to command the Dutch landing division of 240 sailors and marines. The English would land 1,400 men and the French 250. On 28 August the Dutch part of the fleet left Yokohama for the straits. The fleet was reassembled near the island of Himeshima in the evening of 3 September. On 4 September the fleet sailed the last stretch to Shimonoseki. The Dutch were in the right column, the English in the center, and the French on the left.

At 4 PM on 5 September the Battle for the Shimonoseki Straits started. Djambi was in the so-called heavy division consisting of the Tartar, Dupleix, Metalen Kruis, Barossa, Djambi and Leopard. On the first day there was about 35 minutes of intense firing between the Japanese batteries and the fleet. Djambi was the only ship in this division that did not suffer significant damage. She was hit in the hull 6 times, many times in the sails, and had a grenade exploding 6 meters above midships. One bullet made a hole in the hull, but the others were stopped by an improvised armor made of heavy chains that protected the battery. On the 5th Djambi fired 54 shot from her 16 cm RML No3, 83 16 cm bullets and 1 regular 16 cm grenade. The 16 cm RML proved effective, but suffered much damage from firing.

On 6 September Djambi would engage the main Japanese battery again, and fired 4 shot from the rifled guns. That day Djambi landed troops that took the battery of Mozi-Saki together with the French. Commander van Rees also landed and tried to embark the guns, but he only succeeded in embarking a 12-pounder. On the 7th Djambi, Tartar, Dupleix and Metalen Kruis were first to enter the straits. On the 8th they reached the small island Hikoshima. They fired at the fortifications, landed and took 16 guns. These were brought on board shortly after, Djambi taking 5 bronze guns. The most junior officer of Djambi would later report these to be two 30-pounders, One 24-pounder and two 12-pounders. The report by Captain Van Rees would be published in Casembroot's work. A different report by an eyewitness on board Djambi was published in the papers.

After a cease fire and treaty had been agreed, Djambi was at some moment designated to remain behind with the Barossa and Tancrede. In the end the Medusa was left behind when the fleet left for Yokohama and Edo. On 29 October Djambi was still in Yokohama with the rest of the fleet. The Medusa would be the first to leave Japan, arriving in Batavia on 15 November. On 28 January 1865 Djambi was still in Yokohama together with the Metalen Kruis. On 3 February 1865 Djambi left Yokohama for Nagasaki. On 26 April she left Hong Kong for Batavia. On 8 May Djambi arrived in Batavia, ending her Japanese campaign.

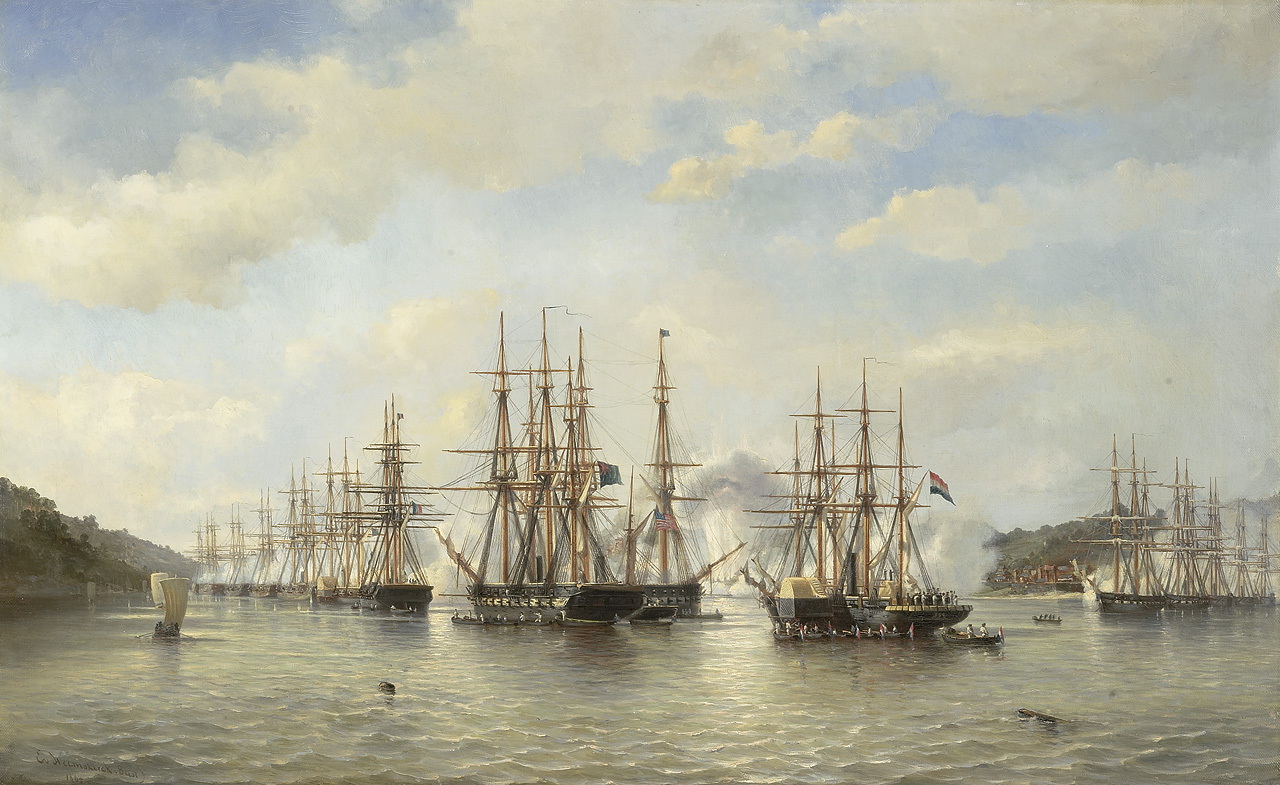
Dutch, English, French and American squadrons in Japanese waters, 1864. By J.E. van Heemskerck van Beest

The affair did spark some national sentiment in the Netherlands. The painter Jacob Eduard van Heemskerck van Beest almost immediately started to make a painting of the fight for the Straits of Shimonoseki, but he did make multiple works on Japan. In December 1864 Captain-Lt van Rees was appointed as Knight 4th class of the Military Order of William. By order of 19 February 1865 the king awarded a flag with the text "Simonoseki" and the date to Djambi.

=== Show of force in Riouw ===
In late June 1865 there were rumors in the Netherlands that Djambi had left Batavia for Holland. Indeed, the Frigate with auxiliary power Adolf Hertog van Nassau did leave Batavia for the Netherlands on 9 May. Djambi however was undergoing small repairs at Onrust on 14 June, and was designated for temporary reinforcement of the bases in Riouw. On 16 June she left for Riouw, arriving there on 20 June. After the Resident of Riouw came on board, Djambi left for Bengkalis, Siak and Deli, accompanied by the Montrado, Delfzijl and Dassoen. Of course trip was meant to show some force. On 1 August Djambi arrived back in Batavia, bringing a Bengal tiger for the local zoo.

=== Conquest of Asahan ===
The next affair came from the Sultanate of Asahan. Some of its inhabitants had committed piracy and offended the English. Djambi, Sindoro and Amsterdam were designated for an expedition together with four other ships from Riouw and 500 men. On 29 August Djambi raised her honorary flag for the first time. On 30 August Djambi, Amsterdam and Sindoro left Batavia for Sumatra. On 9 September a force consisting of Djambi, Amsterdam, Sindoro, Montrado, Delfzijl and Dassoen left Tanjung Pinang for Batubara Regency under the command of Captain-lt Van Rees and Major van Heemskerck. On 12 September the troops landed in Batubara, and on 13 September an infantry company took Abdullah prisoner. He was kept on board Djambi. Next an overland expedition started to march towards the Sultanate's residency in Rantou-Pandjang. On 17 September the fleet steamed to the mouth of the Assahan river and on the 18th it took Tanjungbalai. On 20 September the expedition kind of ended with the conquest of Si Rantan, the residency of the Sultan. On 18 October Djambi and Amsterdam, with most of the landing troops departed for Riouw. On 28 October Djambi, Amsterdam and Ardjoenon left Riouw for Batavia, arriving there on 31 October. On 14 November Djambi left for Tanara on the north coast of Java. She went to quench a mutiny on board the French merchant Cezard. She arrested 5 men, and handed them to the "wachtschip" in Batavia. Next she went for repairs at Onrust.

=== To the Netherlands ===
On 4 January 1866 Djambi left Batavia for the Netherlands. On 11 February she anchored in Cape town, from whence she left on 24 February. On 16 April she anchored in the Texel roadsted. On 17 April 1866 she finally arrived in Nieuwediep. A report noted that in 524 days at sea, she had traversed 15,245 miles, of which 6,289 steaming and 8,956 sailing, firing 5,144,175 kg of coal, and using two sets of sails. On 18 September 1866 Djambi entered the Dock I in Willemsoord. After the water had been pumped out, the dock itself showed considerable damage. but this was repaired while Djambi was in the dock. She would remain inactive for almost two years.

== Second East Indies Campaign ==
=== Captain-Lt J.E. Buys takes command ===
On 5 August 1868 Captain-lt J.E. Buys was appointed to take command of Djambi on 1 September, the ship getting re-commissioned per that date. On 14 September Djambi made a trial trip on the North Sea, making 10 knots. On 21 September Djambi left the Texel roadstead for the East Indies, passing Dungeness on the 22nd. On 8 November Djambi anchored in Bahia Brazil, planning to continue to the Indies on the 12th.

=== Visit to Thailand ===
On 16 January 1869 Djambi arrived in Batavia, where some repairs were made at Onrust. On 21 March she left for Thailand, to visit the two kings of that state. She left Bangkok on 18 April. On 23 April she arrived in Singapore, and on 28 April she arrived back in Batavia.

=== Cruises on the Java Sea ===
In the summer of 1869 Djambi started on two cruising trips for exercise and fighting piracy. The first lasted from 6 July till the 21st, when she arrived back in Batavia from the east. On 1 August Djambi left Batavia for a second cruise on the Java Sea. The first destination would be Samarang. On 16 August she arrived in Banyuwangi on Java, from whence she left on 24 August. On 4 September she left from Samarang. On the 12th she left Cirebon, arriving back in Batavia on 14 September. At about this time Buys was promoted to the rank of captain.

=== Stationary service ===
By 15 October 1869 Djambi was serving as "Wachtship" in Batavia, but on 4 December she left Batavia for Cirebon. By 15 December she was "stationed" there, meaning it would be her base. On 12 March 1870 Djambi arrived in Samarang under Commander J.H.K. Croes. On 16 March Djambi left Samarang under Captain-lt Croes, she arrived in Batavia on 18 March. On 5 April she arrived in Samarang from Cirebon, leaving there on the 11th, and arriving in Batavia on the 15th. In June Djambi was in the Alor Strait together with the steam corvette Willem. On 22 July 1870 the Willem, Aart van Nes and Djambi left for Madjene (Celebes) to remind the sultan he had to offer his respects in Makassar. From Makassar Djambi continued to Borneo, and in October she was in Batavia. On 19 December 1870 she left Batavia for Samarang.

In March 1871 Djambi was in Batavia. Together with the steam corvettes Curacao and Willem, the sloop Marnix, and the paddle steamers Sumatra and Amsterdam she would have to impress the king of Thailand during his visit. On 13 April 1871 Captain-lt J.H.K. Croes suddenly died. The command of Djambi was temporarily given to Lieutenant 1st class S. Kraijenhoff van de Leur. In May Captain-lt D.L. Feldman of the Borneo became commander of Djambi. In June he was replaced in turn by Captain F. Koopman.

=== Three visits to Aceh ===
On 12 August 1871 Djambi left Batavia for Padang. In early September Djambi under Koopman was still there. She left on 9 September with the Controleur E.R. Kraaijenhoff on a mission to Aceh. On 20 November Djambi was back in Padang. Later it became publicly known that this had been a reconnaissance mission.

By 15 January 1872 Djambi was "temporarily stationed" at Padang and by 15 February this was still the case. In February 1872 Captain C.J. Damme was appointed as commander of Djambi. By 10 April Djambi was still in Padang. On 14 May 1872 Djambi sailed to Aceh again under commander T. van der Veld Erdbrink. She met a rather hostile reception, the sultan refusing to receive the visitors. By June 1872 Djambi was back in Padang.

In September 1872 it became known that Resident Schiff would make a trip to Aceh on board Djambi. On 13 October she left for Batavia. Extra lodgings were built on the campaign to house the dignitaries. In December Captain N.M.J. Kroef became the new commander of Djambi. In January it became known that Resident Schiff would not go to Aceh, but Djambi and some other commissioners would. On 30 January Djambi left Batavia for Riouw. in Riouw the commissioners and some gifts for the Sultan of Aceh and dignitaries would be taken on board. Officially it would sail in order to practice the crew. In fact this decision was made: "in order not to put too much strain on the boilers. If too much is required of these, the vessel will never arrive in one piece in Holland, for which it has to sail shortly." In the end other developments led to the mission being aborted.

=== The Aceh War ===
The Aceh War proper started with the First Aceh Expedition. The Dutch assembled a relatively large force of 6 warships (Djambi, Citadel van Antwerpen, Marnix, Surabaya, Sumatra and Coehoorn), and about 3,000 men. Djambi was the strongest of these ships, and was to become the flagship. She was ordered by telegraph to sail straight from Riouw to Aceh, meeting the expedition before Banda Aceh. On 5 April 1873 all ships came before Banda Aceh. Djambi opened fire on some fortifications on the right side of the river. The expedition quickly turned into a failure. The dismal state of the fleet, was one of the causes. It was doubtful whether the fleet would be able to maintain communications once the monsoon arrived. The boilers of Djambi, Marnix and Coehoorn were so bad that were not steam ready, and could not use their distilling machines all the time. Therefore, they might have got beached in bad weather. There were days that Djambi was not at all able to use her engine, and when she could, she did not go faster than 3 knots. On 21 May 1873 Djambi arrived back in Batavia.

== Final Voyage ==
On 15 July Djambi was being prepared for her home voyage at Onrust. On 6 August 1873 Djambi under Captain Koopman left Batavia for the Netherlands. In early September Djambi ran into a violent storm that lasted for 7 days east of the Cape of Good Hope. She had some damage, primarily in the rigging, and therefore anchored in Port Elizabeth on 10 September. She would continue her trip on the 15th. On 21 September the Djambi indeed arrived in Simon's Town, being joined there by the Marnix under Captain-lt Rietveld on the 22nd. The Marnix would continue to the Netherlands on 4 October. The Dutch merchant bark ship Soderham 847t captain H.Y. Visser arrived in Cape Town from Moulmain on 17 November after a mutiny. It took on board some sailors of Djambi and continued to Amsterdam on 23 November.

Somewhere in October / November 1873 it became clear that Djambi was unfit to continue to the Netherlands. This was a technical disappointment as well as a political setback. Djambi was 13 years old at the time, much too young to be decommissioned for technical reasons. In a political sense decommissioning Djambi provided ammunition to those who had all along stated that the navy in the Indies had been neglected. In late November rumors that the transport ship Java was being prepared to retrieve the men and inventory of the Djambi "declared unfit" at the Cape surfaced in the media. On 11 December the secretary for the navy said in the lower house that what happened to Djambi was a real pity. That he was surprised when he got the first report by the commander, but that at that moment it was supposed that the ship could be repaired at relatively low cost. On 18 December he declared that in October 1872 he got a message that the hull of Djambi was satisfactory, and the boilers could still last a year.

In December 1873 the steam corvette Challenger of the Challenger expedition visited Cape Town. The officers of Djambi were invited to the ball at the governor's house. On 13 February 46 officers and men of Djambi arrived in Hellevoetsluis via London. On 19 February Djambi fired a salute to commemorate the birthday of the Dutch king, the salute was answered by the English Flora. On 1 January 1874 the transport ship Java had been commissioned. On 27 January she had left Texel for the Cape, arriving there on 23 March. On 12 April the Java left again for home. She had on board the officers, men, machinery and part of the inventory of the sold Djambi. She would arrive in Nieuwediep on 1 June. The date that Djambi was sold was probably 9 April 1874, because later on Koopman was deemed to have left the command on that date. A message dated Cape Town 14 April stated that Djambi had been sold for 1,765 GBP (21,000 florins) to a Mr. Flower from Cape Town. She would be converted to a sail-only ship.
