= Djambi-class corvette =

Class of steam corvettes of the Royal Netherlands Navy

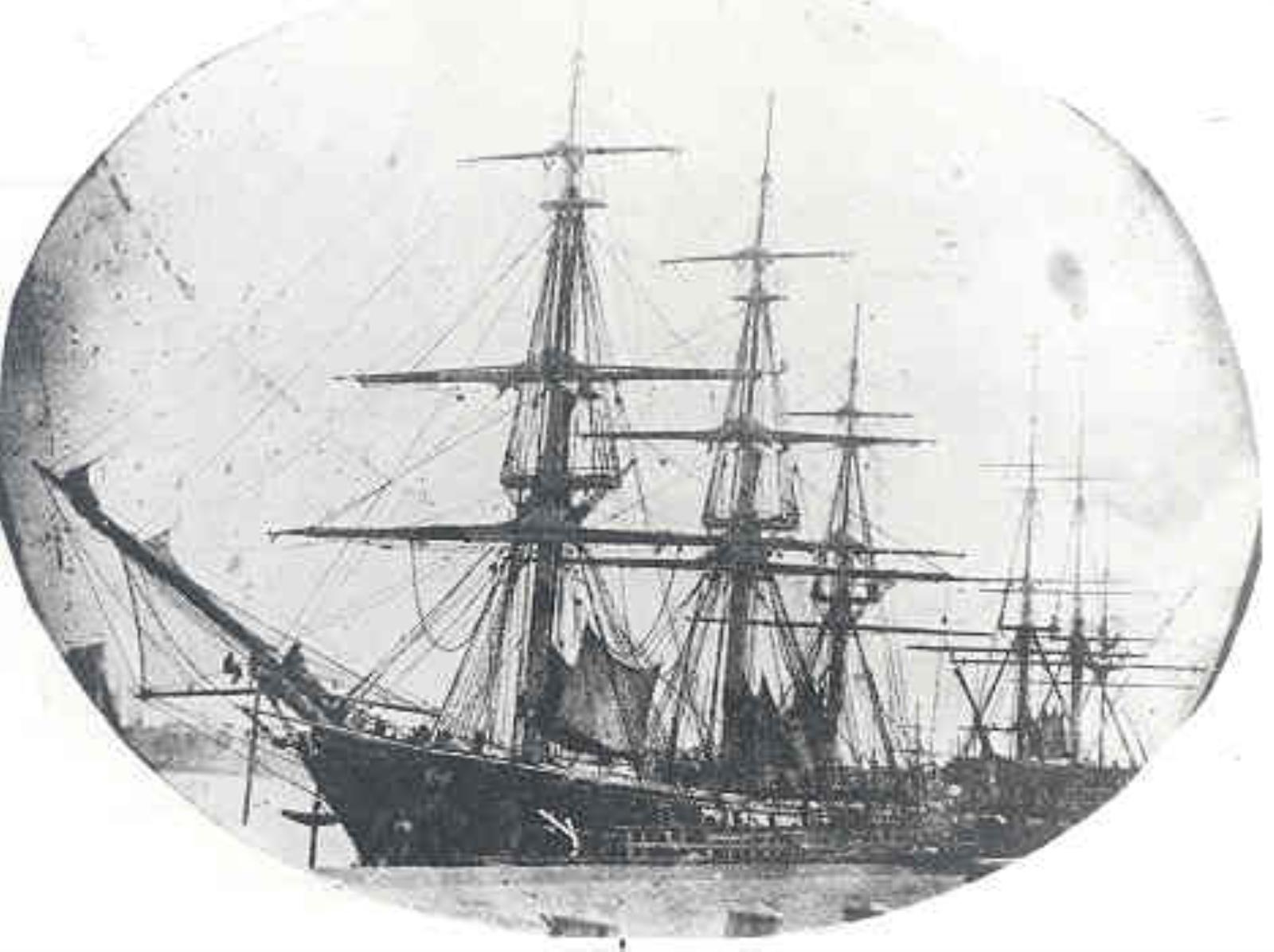
- The Djambi

Class overview
- Name: Djambi class
- Builders: Rijkswerf Amsterdam, Rijkswerf Vlissingen
- Operators: Royal Netherlands Navy
- Preceded by: Groningen class
- Succeeded by: Zilveren Kruis class
- In commission: 1861?–?
- Completed: 6
- Scrapped: 6

General characteristics
- Type: Steam Corvette
- Tonnage: 1,083 tons
- Displacement: 2,030 tons
- Length: 58.00 m (190 ft 3 in)
- Beam: 12.25 m (40 ft 2 in)
- Draught: 5.50 m (18 ft 1 in)
- Installed power: 250 nominal horsepower; 700 indicated horsepower (520 kW)
- Speed: 8.5 knots (15.7 km/h)
- Complement: 225
- Armament: 4-16 × RML 16 cm No. 3; 12-0 × 30-pdr SBML
- Armour: ship made of wood

The Djambi class was a class of steam corvettes of the Royal Netherlands Navy. The class comprised Djambi, Zoutman, Willem, Leeuwarden, Metalen Kruis and Curaçao. Later two ships of a supposedly 'slightly revised' type were built, the Zilveren Kruis-class corvettes.

== Dutch Naval Plans in the 1850s ==
=== Plan 1855 ===
The Dutch naval plan 1855 called for a screw corvette of 250 hp as standard fighting warship for the East Indies. The steam corvettes of the Groningen class were the first of this type. They were designated as 'Steamships second class'. The Djambi's were meant to supplement the number of these 'Steamships second class'.

=== Corvettes and armored ships ===
Even before the first of the Djambi class was launched, the whole class became technically obsolete when the French ironclad Gloire entered service in August 1860. The Djambi's could not damage armored ships, and were slower than most of them. For service in the colonies however, many nations continued to use (and build) wooden corvettes.

=== Dutch rating system ===
When the first Djambi's were ordered, they were designated as 'screw steamships first class'. When the lead ship Djambi was launched it was a 'screw steamships second class'. Still later they were again designated as '(Screw) Steamship first class'. This had to do with the Dutch rating system. In 1858 the Dutch navy had: ships of the line in two classes; frigates in two classes; corvettes in two classes etc. They kind of doubled this system for steamships, having 3 frigates with auxiliary power (45-51), 2 corvettes with steampower (19), 3 screw steamships of the second class, 5 screw steamships of the 4th class. For Steam paddlers there were also 4 classes.

The change in designation of the Djambi class had to do with this rating system. In the sailing age the Dutch had corvettes that had their guns below the upper deck ('kuilkorvet'), and corvettes that had their battery on the upper deck (gladdeks korvet). The classification of the Djambi's (with their guns on the upper deck) as steam ships of the second class left room for a 'Steamship first class'. Later on two wooden ships of the Anna Paulowna-class would actually be laid down as 'Steamship first class'.

== Design ==
Apart from the Dutch artificial classification in screw steamships of a certain class, the Dutch also spoke about ships in terms of actual type. This happened e.g. during the discussions about the 1862 naval budget. There were calls for a kuilkorvet (corvette with covered gundeck) of 22 guns, 350hp and 250 men. At the same the Djambi's were designated as corvettes, and in particular as flush deck corvettes. While they were laid down in 1859-1860 Leeuwarden and Curaçao were referred to as 'Steam Corvettes'.

In all probability the design of the Djambi class was based on the experience gained with the preceding corvette class which included Groningen, Vice Admiraal Koopman and Citadel van Antwerpen. The Djambi class was two meters longer and 1-1.5 meter wider. That is, they were about 10-14% wider.

At the time the Dutch built the Djambi England built the slightly larger corvette HMS Orpheus of the Jason class.

== Propulsion ==
The Djambi class had machines of 250 nominal horsepower, which was the same as that of the preceding corvette class. When the Dutch shifted to using indicated horse power, the machines were measured at 700 indicated horse power. The difference is due to nominal horse power not taking steam pressure into account. Therefore indicated horse power is a better measure.

The machines for Djambi were made by Fijenoord, the shipyard of the NSBM in Rotterdam, and tried in April 1861. The machines for two other early ships of the class were made by Van Vlissingen en Dudok van Heel in Amsterdam.

In August 1862 Zoutman made a trial course on the Nieuwediep that was deemed 'satisfactory'. She attained a speed of 8-8.5 knots. In an 1875 overview all existing ships of the class were said to attain 8.5 knots maximum. The earlier English corvette HMS Pearl of about equal size made 11.3 knots, but had 400 nominal and 1324 ihp, almost double the effective power.

== Armament ==
=== Rifled and smoothbore muzzleloaders ===
The Djambi's carried a mix of rifled muzzleloaders of 16 cm caliber (RML) and smoothbore muzzleloaders (SBML) of 16 cm caliber, known as long 30-pounders. Both cannon had a caliber of 16 cm, but the more modern rifled gun fired a cylindrical object and the smoothbore gun fired a traditional circular bullet of 30 pounds. With the invention of the rifled gun, nations switched from using bullet weight for classification of their guns, to using 'bullet' diameter. The rifled gun was designated by its diameter, because it could fire an object of arbitrary weight. On the contrary the weight of the shot of the traditional smoothbore gun could be derived directly from its bore.

=== Rifled gun 16 cm No. 3 ===
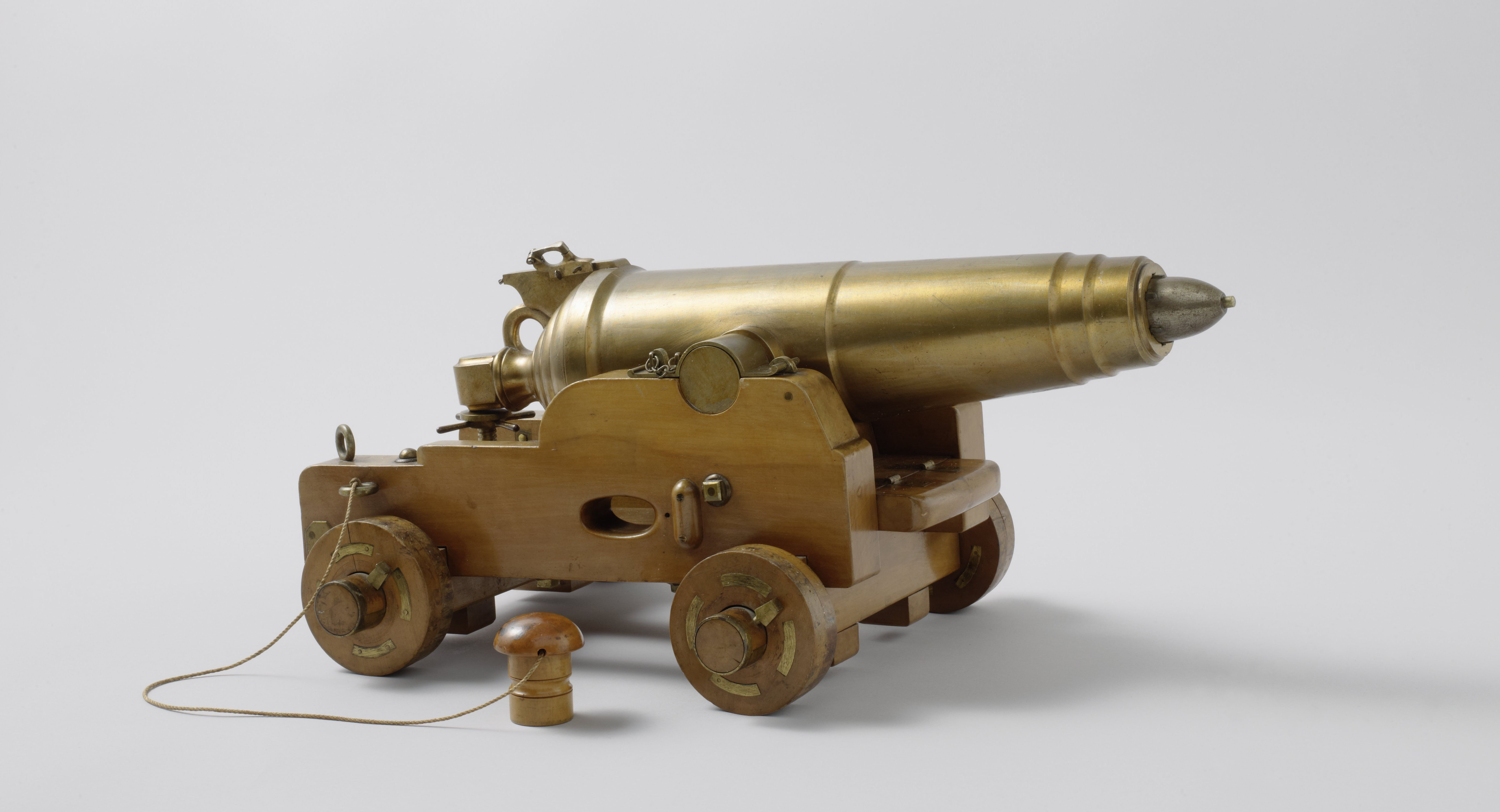
The rifled muzzleloader Getrokken Kanon 16 cm No. 3

The rifled gun used on the Djambi's was the RML 16 cm No. 3, introduced in 1862. It was the first attempt to produce a large caliber rifled gun for the Dutch navy. The gun was made by converting old bronze carronades by filling them up and reboring them. The guns were soon known to be almost completely ineffective against armored ships. This was not such a problem for the Djambi's, because they were not meant to fight armored ships.

Initially HNLMS Djambi, lead ship of the class and Zoutman, had only 4 RML 16cm No.3 and 12 smoothbore 30-pounders. Later each of the Djambi's was armed with 8 rifled muzzleloaders of 16 cm caliber and 8 smoothbore muzzleloaders of 16 cm caliber. Still later, Leeuwarden and Curaçao had lost their old smoothbore 30-pounders, and each had 16 rifled 16 cm guns. Probably from the by then retired Zoutman and Willem.

=== Long 30-pounder No. 4 ===
The classic smoothbore gun was the long 30-pounder No.4, at least that's what Metalen Kruis had in 1880 The 30-pdr long No. 4 had been introduced in 1853 and had a barrel length of 3.19 meters. This was longer than the 30-pounder long No. 2 found in the previous corvettes, which was only 2.77 long.

There were rumors that with her beam of 12.25 meters Djambi was too narrow to properly operate all the guns. The 'problem' was probably caused by the smoothbore guns. Djambi was about 50 cm wider on each side than the previous class, and so the increased barrel length of (3.19-2.77) 42 cm should not have been a problem. However, that does not help if all kinds of obstacles are placed on the extra space.

== Ships in the class ==
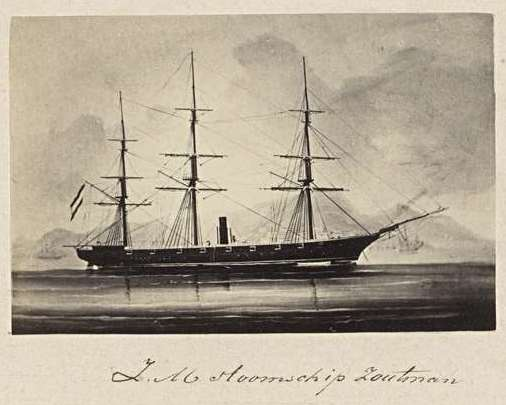
Zoutman in Hong Kong Roadstead in 1866

Of the 6 ships 4 were built at the Rijkswerf in Amsterdam and 2 (Leeuwarden, Curaçao) at the Rijkswerf in Vlissingen.

Name	Laid down	Launched	Commissioned	Fate
Djambi	29 December 1858	31 October 1860	1 June 1861	May 1874 sold
Zoutman	5 November 1859	20 September 1861	16 June 1862	Unfit August 1871
Willem	19 February 1861	8 July 1863	16 June 1866	Decommissioned 15 Sep. 1871 BU 1874
Leeuwarden	6 December 1859	19 October 1861	16 August 1866	Unfit 1885
Metalen Kruis (ex. Soerabaya)	21 March 1860	29 July 1862	1 November 1863	BU 1879
Curaçao	14 July 1860	10 December 1863	16 May 1867	Retired as guardship in Surabaya Nov 1885
