= RML 7-inch Armstrong Gun =

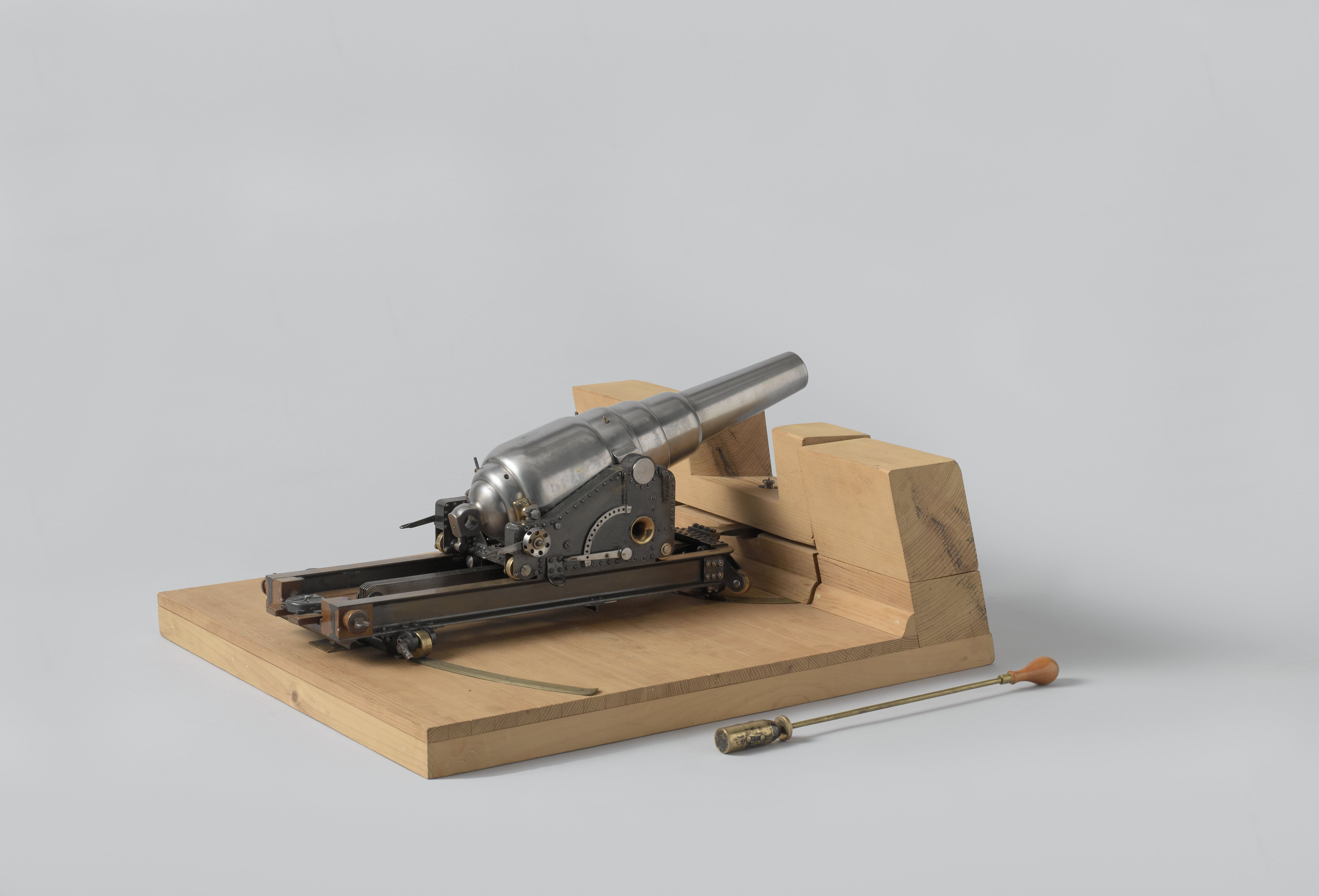
- Rijksmuseum Model of RML 7-inch Armstrong Gun as mounted on Zilveren Kruis
- Type: Naval gun
- Place of origin: United Kingdom

Service history
- In service: Netherlands 1869
- Used by: Royal Netherlands Navy

Production history
- Manufacturer: Elswick Ordnance Company

Specifications
- Mass: 7,290 kg
- Length: 3.353-metre (132 in)
- Calibre: 7-inch (178 mm)

The RML 7-inch Armstrong Gun was a rifled muzzle loading gun. It was an export version of the British Royal Navy's RML 7-inch gun. The RML 7-inch Armstrong Gun was produced by William Armstrong's Elswick Ordnance Company.

== Context ==
=== The Armstrong gun ===
In 1859 the United Kingdom adopted rifled breechloading guns, the so called Armstrong guns, designed by William Armstrong, 1st Baron Armstrong. Armstrong then became engineer of rifled ordnance. The Armstrong guns would be produced at the Royal Works at Woolwich as well as at the new Elswick Ordnance Company founded in Newcastle on 1 January 1859. The latter was founded with government support. It was to guarantee the separation of Armstrong's interests as a civil servant and his interests as a machine builder.

For the navy, the Armstrong breechloaders came in 40-pounder (4.75 inch), 70-pounder (6.4 inch) and 110-pounder (7 inch) caliber. In combat and trials, the guns up to and including 40-pounder caliber, proved to be very successful after some modifications had been made. In the 1863 Bombardment of Kagoshima the eight 110-pounder guns involved were also very successful. They were a bit liable to disturbances, but the problem with the wedge breech was solved to satisfaction.

=== Woolwich guns ===
In March 1862 the Battle of Hampton Roads showed just how difficult it was to penetrate a ship's armor. In 1864 a comparative test of three types of 70-pounder guns took place. In this test, Armstrong advised against using a powder charge higher than 9 pounds with his breechloader. Meanwhile the other guns that were tested, the Armstrong muzzle loader, and the Whitworth muzzle loader, used 14 and 12 pounds of gunpowder to fire a shot weighing about 70 pounds. Even with these charges penetration proved difficult. The Royal Navy therefore turned to muzzle-loading rifled guns.

The new muzzle loaders became known as Woolwich guns. Armstrong had improved the Royal Artillery works at Woolwich to produce his breechloaders, but left office in 1863. The Woolwich Works then started to manufacture RML guns. These used Armstrong's method of manufacturing the gun barrel, and the first attempts to produce a RML also used his shunt principle for rifling. This is why one could carelessly refer to these guns as Armstrong guns, but they were not manufactured by Armstrong's company, which would then be known as Elswick Ordnance Company, part of Armstrong's. In 1865 Woolwich introduced RML's of 7 and 9-inch. These used a new rifling system called the Woolwich system, and the guns were therefore named Woolwich guns.

=== The Armstrong RML (this type of gun) ===
While the Royal Navy made its own guns at Woolwich, Armstrong's Elswick Ordnance Company in Newcastle was merged back into the Armstrong company. Elswick also continued to produce heavy guns, but now only for export. One of these was a 7-inch RML, referred to by the Dutch and others as a 18 cm Armstrong gun. Therefore, the Dutch and others referred to an Armstrong gun, meaning that it was manufactured by Armstrong at Elswick. The British could not afford to refer to the gun by the manufacturer's name without using the qualifier 'Muzzle Loading', because in England, an 'Armstrong gun' referred to the Armstrong gun, which denotes a type of gun, not the manufacturer of the gun.

== Characteristics ==
=== Dimensions ===
The general characteristics of the RML 7-inch Armstrong Gun, like length and caliber were the same as those of the 7-inch Woolwich gun. In the Royal Navy, the 7-inch Woolwich gun had been introduced in 1865 as a broadside or pivot gun for frigates. At the same time the 9-inch Woolwich gun became the standard gun for heavy ironclads.

=== Coils ===
A marked difference between the Armstrong manufactured RML gun and the Woolwich guns was in the number of coils. A coil was a wrought iron part pressed against the steel inner tube to prevent it from bursting under the pressure of the charge. The Armstrong gun retained a larger number of smaller coils, which was more expensive to make. On pictures these coils show as humps as the gun gets smaller while it protrudes to the front.

The Rijksmuseum model of the RML 7-inch Armstrong Gun shows 5 coils. The picture of the RML 7-inch gun (Woolwich) Mark I shows 1 more. The Rijksmuseum model also shows coils in the rear of the gun.

=== Grooves ===
The RML 7-inch Armstrong Gun as used by the Dutch navy had only three grooves.

== Usage ==
=== Chilean Navy ===
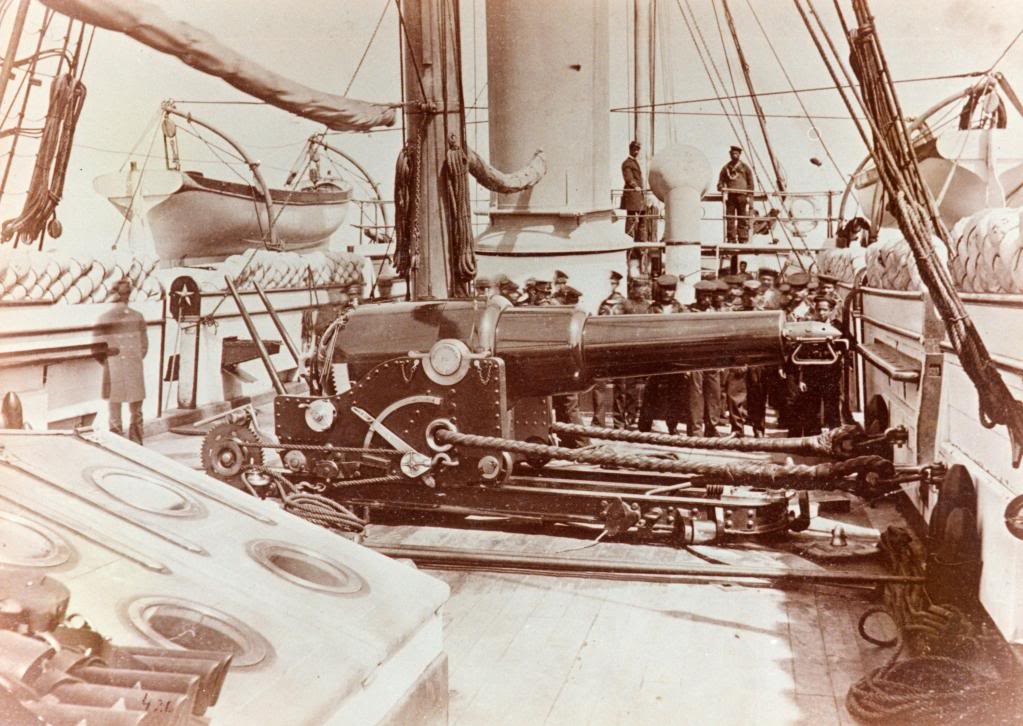
The main gun at the Chilean corvette Magallanes

Locally known as cañón giratorio de 115 libras (rifled 115-pounder), an Armstrong 7-inch muzzle-loader was selected as the main armament of the Chilean Navy corvette Magallanes.

=== Dutch Navy ===
For rifled guns, the Dutch navy at first relied on national developments like the RML 16 cm No. 3. When the Dutch decided to build an armored fleet for home defense, they selected the RML 9-inch Armstrong Gun as its main armament. In this respect, they closely followed the Royal Navy, which at first mounted the RML 9-inch 12-ton gun as its main armament.

For their unarmored steam frigates and corvettes, the Dutch at first continued to rely on 16 cm RML's. In 1869 the Dutch navy then adopted the RML 7-inch Armstrong Gun for some of its unarmored ships. Most of these were gunvessels which policed the Dutch East Indies. E.g. the Pontianak-class gunvessels.

== Ammunition ==
=== Dutch ammunition ===
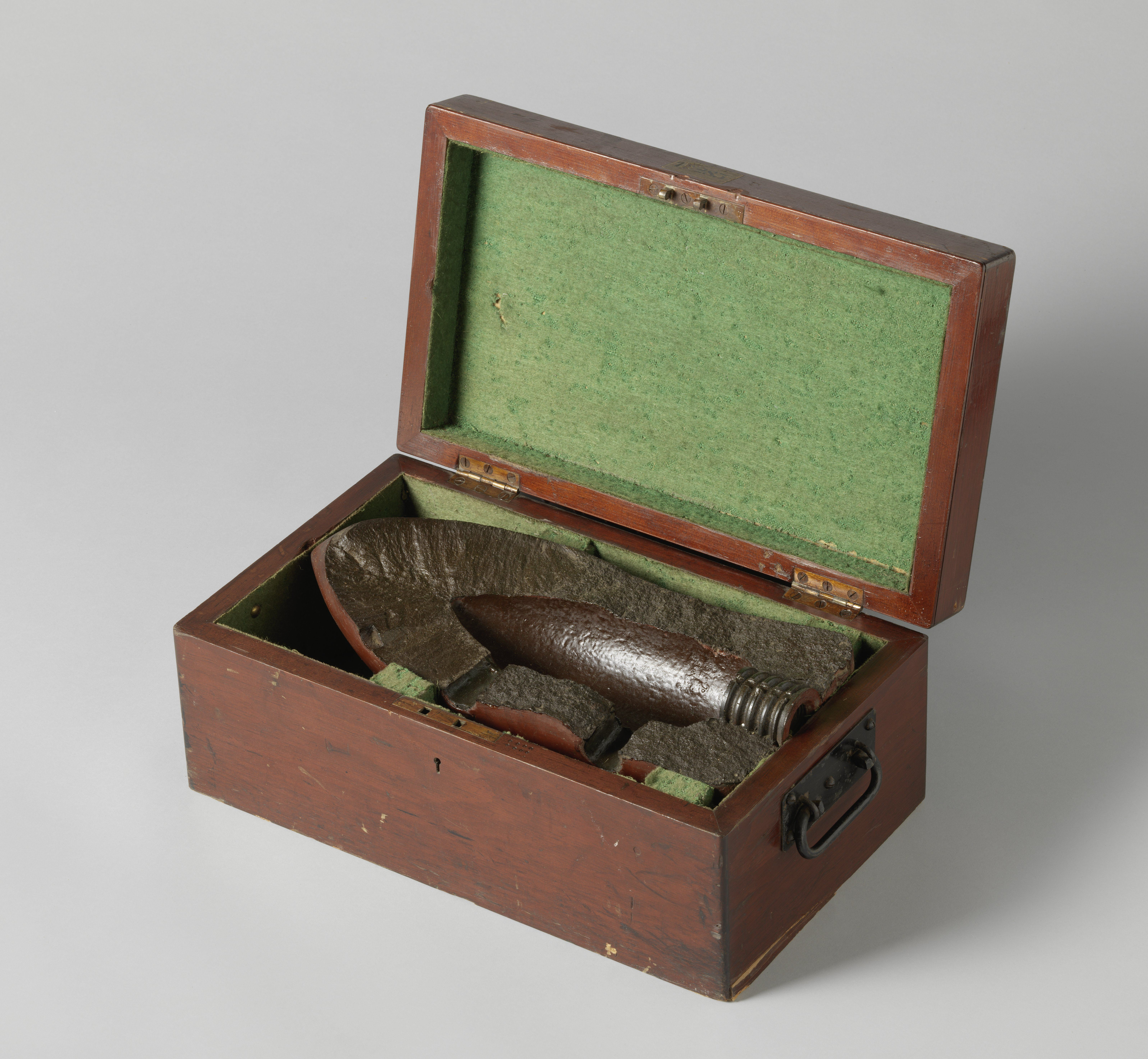
Hardened Palliser shell MK III 7 inch RML

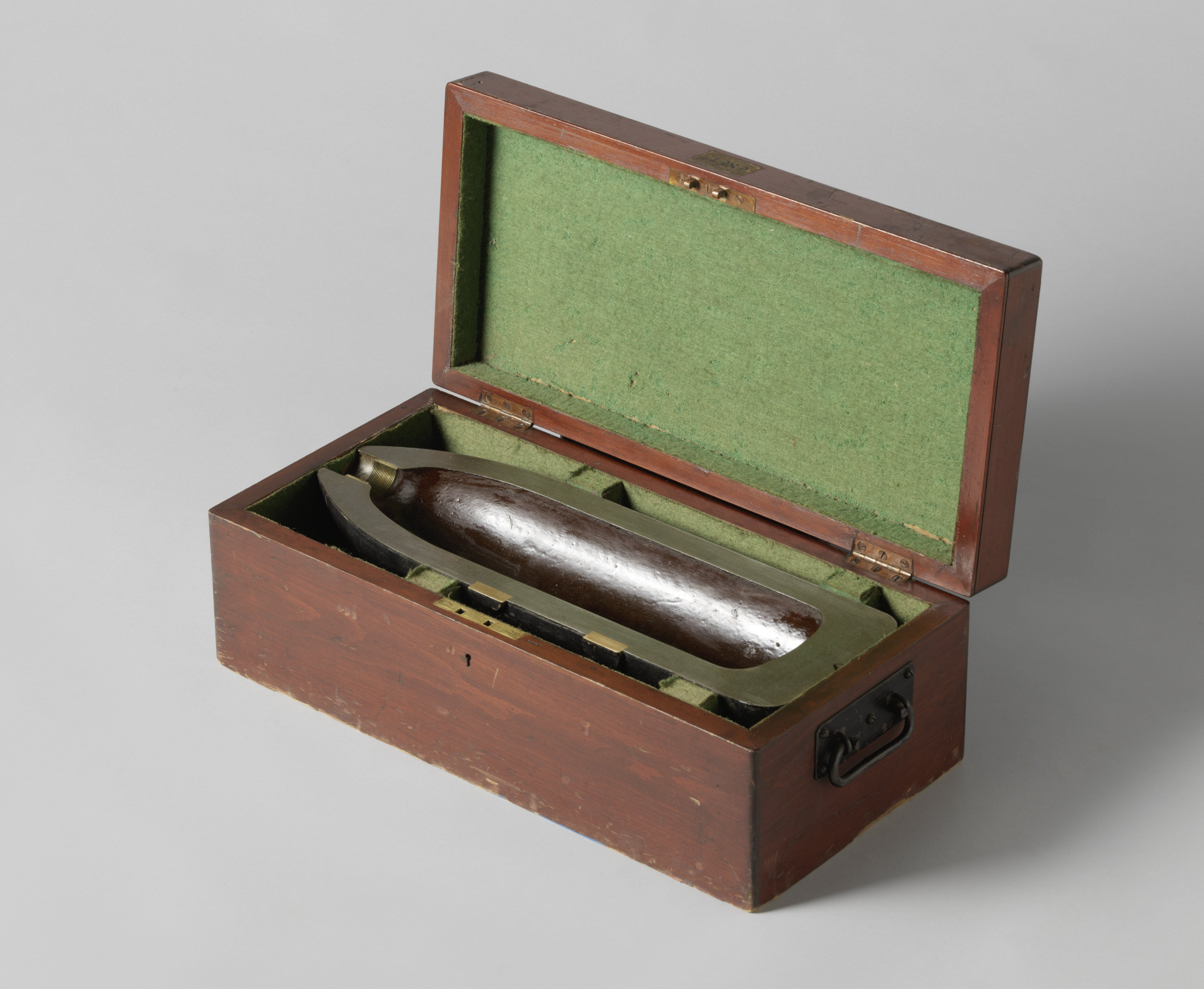
Common shell MK V 7 inch RML

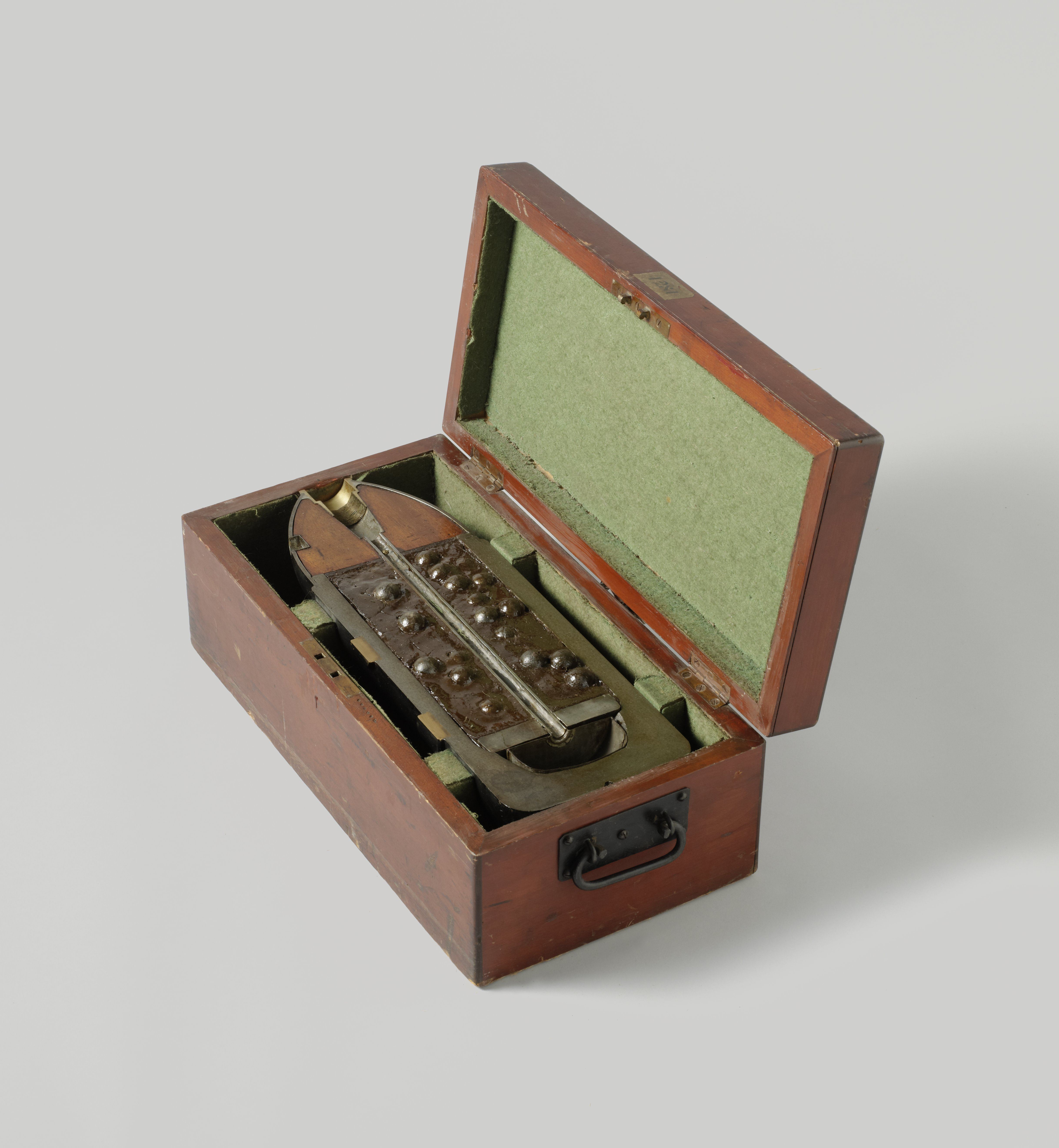
Probably Boxer Shrapnel Mk II 7 inch RML

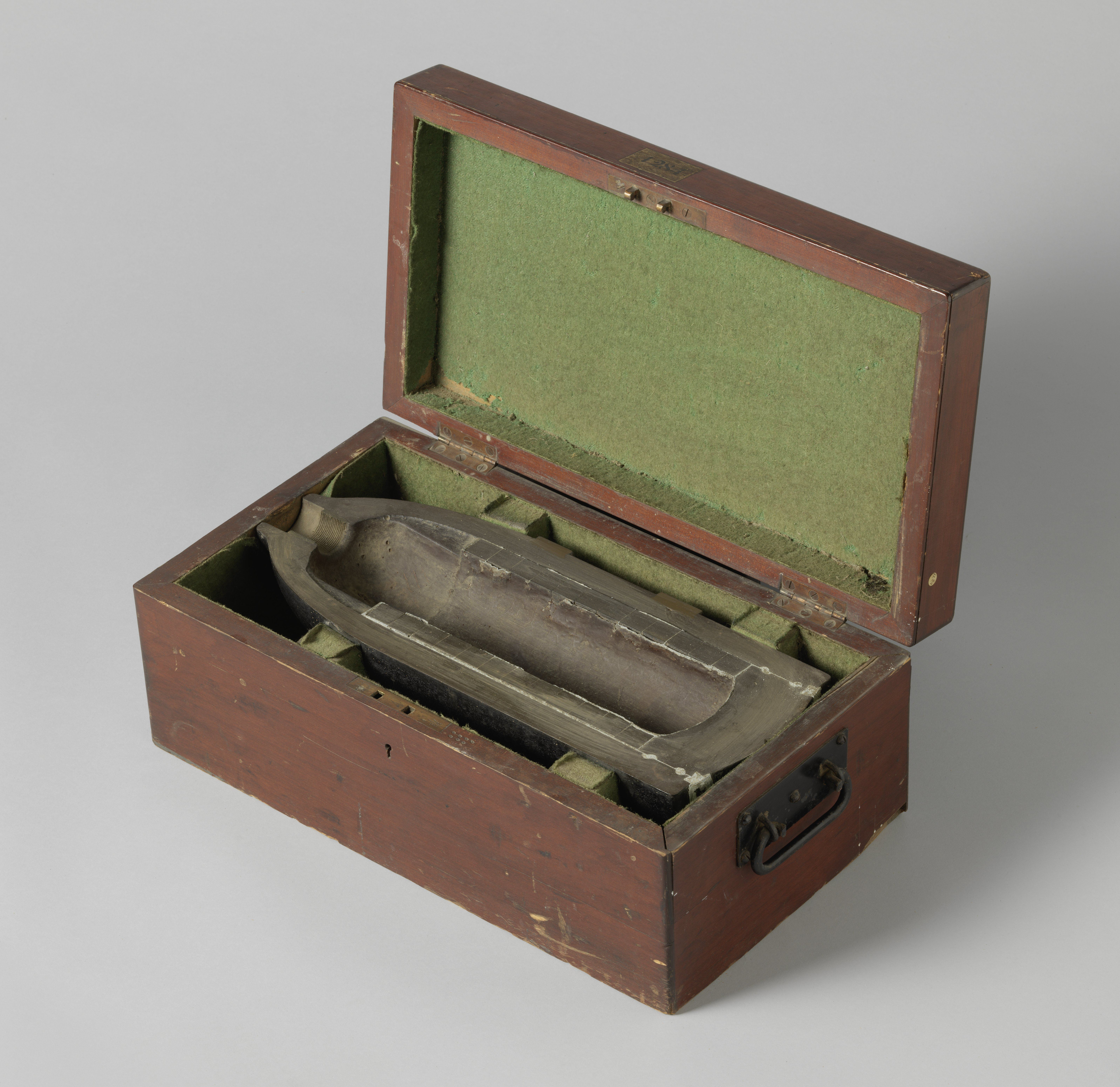
18 cm. Segmentgranaat in wooden box

The Dutch used two kinds of pointed iron grenades puntgranaat for the 7 inch Armstrong gun. A normal iron grenade of 51.6 cm and 48.75 kg, and a hardened grenade of 41 cm and 51.5 kg

There was also a massive 'pointed bullet' (puntkogel) of 38 cm long and 52.5 kg. Finally, there was a shrapnel shot containing a mixture of big and small bullets. The shrapnel shot weighed 31 kg.
