= RML 16 cm No. 3 =

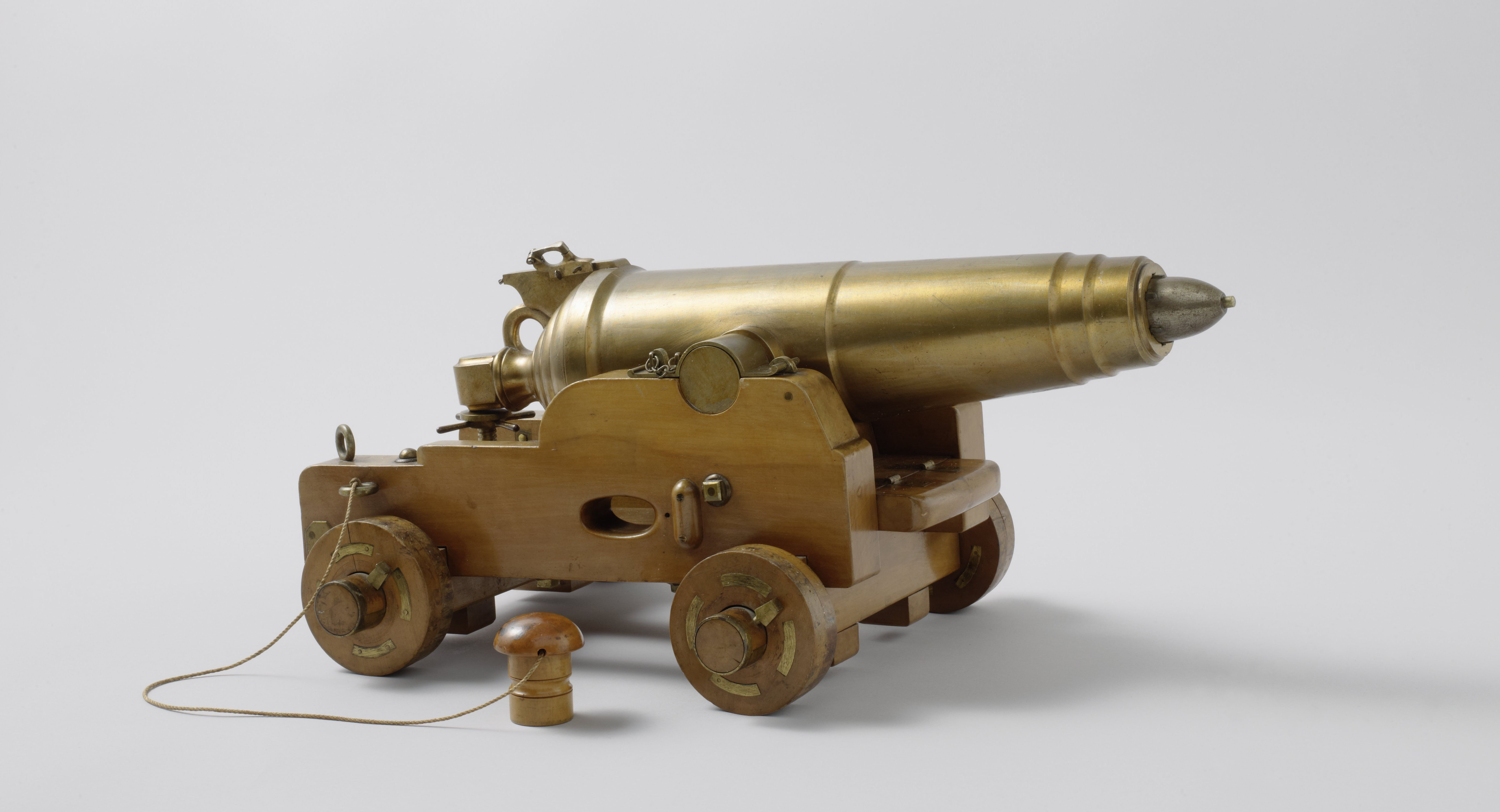
- The rifled muzzle loader Getrokken Kanon 16 cm No. 3
- Type: Naval gun
- Place of origin: Netherlands

Service history
- In service: 1862 - 1881
- Used by: Royal Netherlands Navy

Production history
- Produced: 1861
- No. built: 38

Specifications
- Mass: 1,792 kg
- Length: 2.05 m
- Caliber: 16-centimetre (6.30 in)
- Muzzle velocity: 283.4 m at 44 m

The RML 16 cm No. 3, or Getrokken kanon van 16 cm No. 3 was a rifled muzzle loading gun. It was a Dutch attempt to cheaply provide rifled ordnance to its navy.

== Context ==
=== Development of the modern rifled gun ===
A rifled gun is a gun that has grooves inside the barrel. Rifling made it possible to fire a cylindrical projectile, and to give it a spin which kept it at course. It made for increased range, better accuracy and increased shot weight for a barrel of the same caliber. The rifling process had been invented in late medieval times, but for artillery it had been abandoned till the nineteenth century.

While many nations experimented with rifled and or breechloading guns in the mid nineteenth century, the French were very successful. Its Navy adopted rifled muzzle loading guns in 1855. Most of these were converted 30-pounders. During the 1859 Franco-Austrian War in Italy, the French army used rifled guns produced according to the La Hitte system. The war proved the superiority of the rifled gun over traditional smooth bore muzzle loading guns.

=== Developments in the Netherlands ===
The message was not lost on the Dutch Army. By August 1859 it was experimenting near Waalsdorp Barracks with a 6-pounder gun rifled according to a design by Major le Clercq. In June 1860 experiments at Waalsdorp continued. Soon after, it became knows that the Dutch were copying the French system for field guns. For this the Dutch had used old 6-pounder guns and 12 cm howitzers. These were filled up with bronze, and then bored out to a 4-pounder caliber. The barrel had six grooves. The iron projectile had 9 or 12 lugs, and range was said to be 3,000 m. By July 1860 the army was busy rifling a 24-pounder gun. On 15 August 1860 a very big rifled fortification gun arrived at Waalsdorp from Delft. This was most probably the 24-pounder mentioned earlier.

In January 1861 the well known gun founder J.J. Maritz got decorated for his role in developing the Dutch rifled guns. In July 1861 King William III also decorated the members of the commission for testing rifled guns. These were: Colonel J.W. Blanken, Major A.L. von Preusschen, and captains F.A.T. Delprat, J.C. Verheije van Sonsbeeck, A.G. Visée, J.P.W. van Cattenburch and O.W.C. de Brauw.

== Development of the RML 16 cm No. 3 ==
=== Developments in the Dutch Navy ===
The Dutch Navy generally followed the English Royal Navy when it came to technological developments. In 1850 the English held trials with existing foreign rifled breechloading guns designed by Wahrendorff and Cavelli. The outcome was that the British government thought that the practical advantage of using rifled guns on board ships was limited. Therefore, the United Kingdom primarily adhered to grenade guns and 68 and 32-pounder smooth bore guns. When France started to rifle and reinforce her old cannon, Britain ordered a similar conversion of 300 of its old cannon. This conversion totally failed during the first trials. The British then hastily ordered the first batch of 100 Armstrong guns in October 1859.

This explains how in October 1861 the Dutch Minister for the Navy could state that experts from many countries thought that the rifled gun would not play a significant role in the world's navies, except for a limited number for special purposes. However, the use of the rifled gun was crucial on board the Dutch floating batteries and coastal defense vessels. Therefore, the navy had sought to acquire rifled guns at moderate cost. By late 1861 four projects were underway: the RML 16 cm No. 3 (which did not have that name yet), a conversion of a 30-pounder gun, and rifling 1-pounder and 3-pounder guns for use on boats.

=== Developing the RML 16 cm No. 3 ===
The inspiration for the 16 cm RML No.3 probably came from the massive numbers of old 30-pounder guns that the French navy converted. In 1861 the Dutch navy had 38 old unfit bronze 60-pounder carronades lying around somewhere. As an experiment one of these was filled up, and then rebored to the smaller caliber of 16 cm (i.e. 30-pounder caliber) and rifled. In the process, the inside of the tube was lengthened by 10 cm. Production of the RML 16 cm No. 3 took place in The Hague.

If the experiment succeeded all 38 carronades would be converted. In November 1861 the experiments were concluded to satisfaction, and 6 more carronades were in the process of being converted. By 1 August 1862 the army had rifled 12 carronades for the navy. This is in line with the October 1862 message that as regards modern artillery, the navy had only some old carronades which had been transformed into rifled guns. Of these, only Djambi and Zoutman had 4 guns each. By September 1863 all 38 carronades had been converted to RML 16 cm No. 3, and a new model 16 cm 100-pounder (the RML 16 cm No. 1) was under development.

=== The gun gets converted to RML 12 cm gun ===
Already by 1871, the gun was deemed unsuitably for the Dutch navy in the long run (see below). By 1871 or before 5 had already been converted to RML 12 cm. 15 were in the process of getting converted, and 18 were planned to be converted soon. This also confirms that there were indeed only 38 RML 16 cm No. 3 made.

The Dutch government budget for 1876 had a rather complete overview of the armament of the fleet. It stated that there were 14 RML 16 cm No. 3 left. The 12 cm RML is also present in the overview, with 21 pieces present. The overview also had a value for all guns. On a single gun level the value of the 14 RML 16 cm No. 3's at 64,400 guilders was equal to that of the 21 12 cm guns at 96,600 guilders. Both guns were valued at 4,600 guilders, which might therefore represent a metal price.

In 1876 a small gun foundry was founded on the premises of the state shipyard Rijkswerf Amsterdam. It started to produce 12 cm bronze breechloading guns. As raw material it used the 12 cm RML's which had been made only a few years before. During production of the first 20 breechloaders, samples were taken from 15 12 cm RML's.

== Characteristics ==
=== Dimensions ===
The RML 16 cm No. 3 was only 2.05 m long. I.e. shorter than all smooth bore muzzle loading 30-pounder guns in use with the Dutch navy. At 1,792 kg it weighed about the same as the medium 30-pounders of the Dutch Navy. This seems obvious, but it is not. While the RML 16 cm No. 3 had the same caliber as the 30-pounder, it packed a lot more metal (the filled up 60-pounder tube) in order to withstand the blast behind the cylindrical projectile. The reason that the weight of both was about the same was that the RML 16 cm No. 3 was made of bronze instead of iron.

=== Number of grooves ===
The RML 16 cm No. 3 had 6 grooves, which started 20 cm from the bottom on the inside of the tube.

=== Ammunition ===
The solid shot for the RML 16 cm No. 3 consisted of cylindrical bullets (puntkogels). These were 41 cm long, of which 25 cm were cylindrical. The diameter was 15.93 cm, weight 47.5 kg. The solid shot had two rows of 6 lugs.

The grenade (puntgranaat) for the RML 16 cm No. 3 came in two varieties. The hardened grenade (glashard), was intended to be used against armored ships. The normal grenade was intended for use against wooden ships. These were 49 and 31 cm long, and weighed 49.5 and 24.4 kg. Each had 6 lugs in front, and 3 aft.

=== Effectiveness ===
On 14 November 1862 trials with the RML 16 cm No. 3 were held near The Hague. With the commission for rifled ordnance and the ministers for War and the Navy present. Shots were fired at an armor plate of 4.5 cm thickness placed at a 45 degree angle. From 150 m away three shots were fired. Two were grenade shots, one of which damaged the plate. The third was a bullet that ripped the armor plate. After a second day of trials, the final conclusion was that none of the 10 rounds fired had pierced the armor.

On 11 February 1863 new trials were held near The Hague. This time there were 11 cm thick armor plates. The rifled 30-pounder gun fired wrought iron solid shot with different charges. After the first four shots there were broad rips in the armor plate. The supporting woodwork was also ripped and bend. Shot three and four destroyed the armor plate, and the fifth shot went through the whole. The Commission for Rifled Guns concluded that the 30-pounder performed better than expected. However, under perfect circumstances, like short and exactly known distance, placement of the armor at a 90 degree angle, and perfect visibility, the 30-pounder had not penetrated the armor with its first shot. Therefore the commission advised to add a heavier caliber gun to the coastal defense forces, and probably also on board the ships.

Whatever the validity and the precise results of the trials were, already in October 1864 the Commission for Coastal Defense expressed severe doubt about the gun's ability to pierce armor. Referring to French investigations, it said that the RML 16 cm No. 3 might have pierced an armor plate, but that for piercing an armored hull, a heavier projectile with a heavier charge was needed. English trials with the RBL 7-inch Armstrong gun had also proved ineffective in piercing an armored hull. The general consensus about the RML 16 cm No. 3 then changed to it being almost completely ineffective against armored ships.

In May 1877 trials were held on board the artillery school ship Het Loo, moored in the Nieuwediep. Nine shots were fired with the grenade of 25.8 kg and a powder charge of 2.25 kg. The average speed of the grenade was 283.4 m at 44 m from the muzzle.

A fundamental problem of the RML 16 cm No. 3 was that it did not weigh enough to absorb recoil. At 1,792 kg it weighed about as much as a medium 30-pounder SBML, and it used an about equivalent charge. However, the 16 cm No. 3 fired a shot that weighed double that of the 30-pounders, resulting in much more recoil. The result was that the gun 'jumped' on its carriage. This made that the Dutch Navy found these guns unsatisfactory for the long term.

== Usage ==
=== On ships ===
The Djambi-class corvettes were the first to get rifled guns. I.e. Djambi and Zoutman initially each got 4 RML 16 cm No. 3 While on board Djambi in Australia, these were described as two rifled 60-pounders on each side. Later ships of the Djambi class would also get the RML 16 cm No. 3. The sloop Watergeus was also reported to have the RML 16 cm No. 3.

Later many ships got a rifled 16 cm gun, but it's not that clear which RML. The RML 16 cm No. 3 was retired from the list of Dutch navy guns between 1 October 1880 and 1 October 1881.

=== In action ===
The RML 16 cm No. 3 was used in combat during the Battle of Shimonoseki Straits, where both Djambi and Metalen Kruis had the gun on board. Djambi fired 54 shot from the RML 16 cm No. 3 during the main fight. Her Captain reported that the RML 16 cm No. 3 did well as regards range and accuracy, but that most broekings (a mechanism to control recoil, consisting of a heavy rope from the bulwark through a ring on the bottom of the gun) were broken, but repaired. From Metalen Kruis 60 shot were fired by the RML 16 cm No. 3. Her commander was also very satisfied as regards range and accuracy, but also reported 7 broekings having to be renewed. He thought that in time, the gun would not stand up to continuous firing.
