= HNLMS Wamandai =

History

Netherlands
- Name: Wamandai
- Operator: Royal Netherlands Navy
- Builder: Rijkswerf Willemsoord, Den Helder
- Laid down: 27 August 1958
- Launched: 28 May 1960
- Commissioned: 1962
- Fate: Sold in 1985

General characteristics
- Type: Tugboat
- Displacement: 126 t (124 long tons)
- Length: 27.25 m (89 ft 5 in)
- Beam: 6.98 m (22 ft 11 in)
- Draught: 2.80 m (9 ft 2 in)
- Propulsion: 1 propeller; 500 hp (370 kW); 1 x 8 cylinder Werkspoor diesel engine
- Speed: 11 knots (20 km/h; 13 mph)
- Crew: 9
- Armament: 2 x 20 mm machine guns

HNLMS Wamandai (A870) was a tugboat of the Royal Netherlands Navy (RNN). She was built in the Netherlands and served between 1962 and 1985 in the RNN.

== Construction ==
On 27 August 1958 Wamandai was laid down and on 28 May 1960 she was launched at the Rijkswerf in Den Helder. The tugboat was commissioned in 1962.

== Service history ==
Wamandai was originally meant to serve in Dutch New Guinea. However, soon after being commissioned it was no longer part of the Kingdom of the Netherlands. The tugboat was therefore sent to Curaçao in May 1964. This made it the first tugboat of the Royal Netherlands Navy (RNN) to be stationed in the Netherlands Antilles.

As a result of increased tension between British Guiana and Suriname the Wamandai was sent in 1964 to guard the entrance to the Corantijn River. The Wamandai was used in this role until the hydrographic survey vessel HNLMS Luymes arrived in Suriname, after which the Wamandai returned to the Netherlands Antilles.

In March 1984 the Wamandai took part in a large navy exercise on Bonaire, during this exercise an amphibious landing was performed.

In 1985 the Wamandai was auctioned and sold by the RNN.
