= Johannes Servaas Lotsy =

Dutch politician

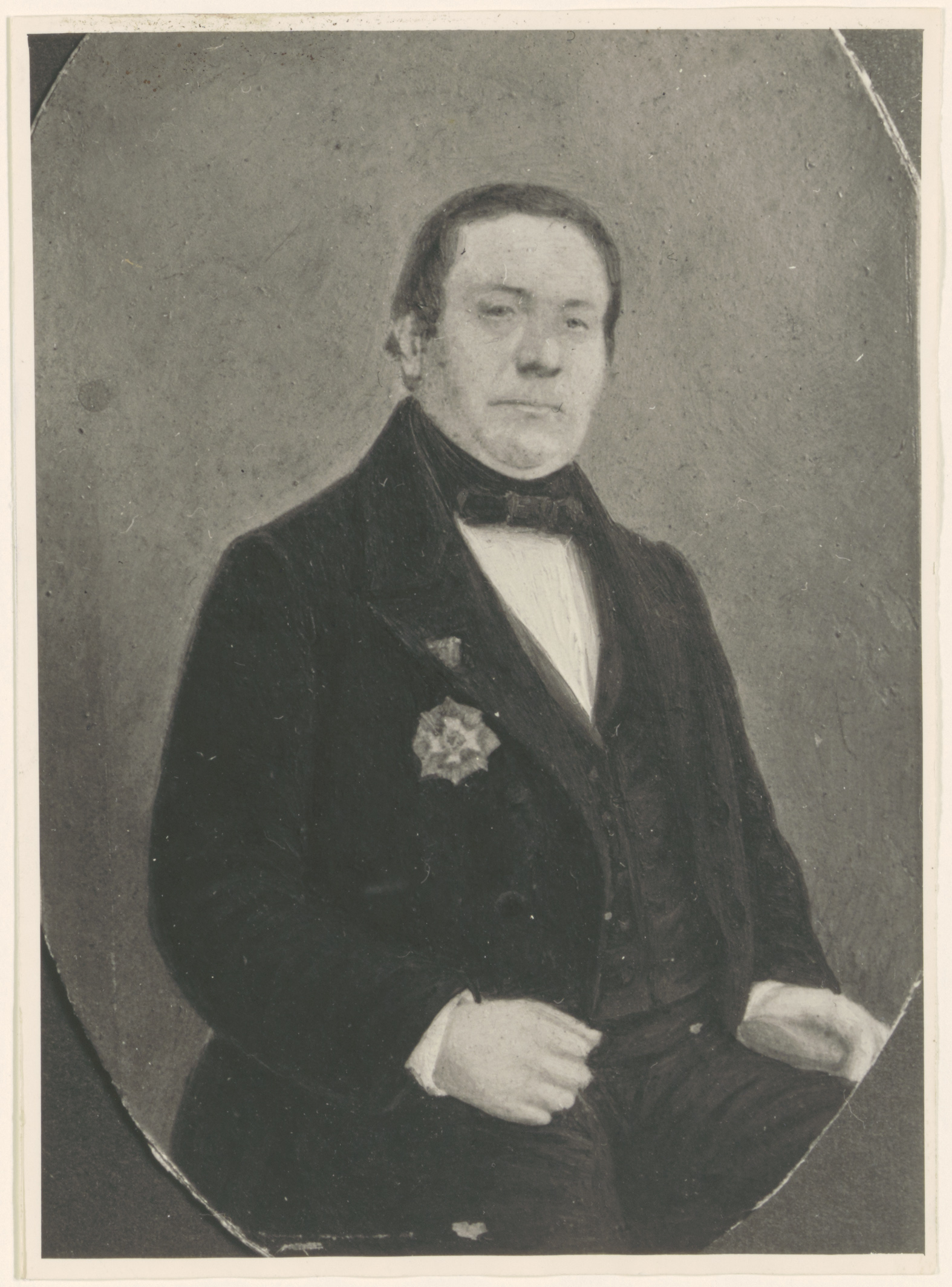
- J.S. Lotsy

Minister of the Navy
- In office 1 August 1856 – 14 March 1861
- Monarch: William III
- Preceded by: Abraham Johannes de Smit van den Broecke
- Succeeded by: Willem Huyssen van Kattendijke

Minister of Colonial Affairs
- In office Jan 1861 – Jan 1861^{[Ad interim]}

Minister of Finance
- In office February 1861 – March 1861^{[Ad interim]}

Personal details
- Born: 31 May 1808 Dordrecht
- Died: 4 April 1863 (aged 54) The Hague
- Education: Leiden University

Johannes Servaas Lotsy (31 May 1808 – 4 April 1863) was a Dutch politician. From 1852 to 1856 he was mayor of Dordrecht.

== Early life ==
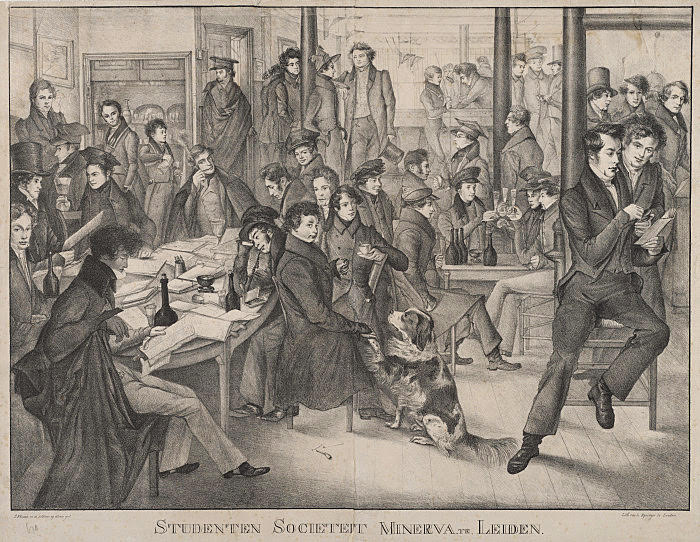
Lotsy (center) during his Leiden student time (1830)

Johannes Servaas Lotsy was born 31 May 1808 in Dordrecht. His father was Servaas Hendrik Lotsy secretary of Dordrecht. His mother was Dideria Clasina Aberson. In Breda his grandfather had married a descendant of Johan de Witt's sister Maria, who had married into the influential Hoeufft family. Johannes Lotsy went to the latin school in Dordecht. Here we was taught by rector Fenema and conrector Ross. Lotsy's nephew Jacob Hendrik Hoeufft, a famous Latin poet influenced his love for the classical studies. In 1828 Lotsy went to Leiden University. In 1831 he became a sergeant in the volunteer company of the Leiden students during the Ten Days' Campaign. He graduated on 31 June 1832 with a thesis titled Quaedam de nullitatibus secundum codicis civilis Gallici principia.

== Career ==
After his graduation Lotsy became a lawyer in Dordrecht, creating a respected practice. In 1847 he was chosen as an extraordinary member of the House of Representatives for the province South Holland. In 1849 he was chosen as a regular member for the Dordrecht district, and seated with the liberals. He was also a member of the Dordrecht municipal council, curator of the Latin School of Dordrecht, and secretary of Dordrecht.

On 8 May 1852 Lotsy became Mayor of Dordrecht, and left the House of Representatives. In 1853 the Provincial Council of South Holland elected him to the Senate. Lotsy held this seat till August 1856.

== Minister of the Navy ==
On 1 August 1856 Lotsy became Minister of the Navy. The oratory skills that his predecessors lacked, were possessed in a high degree by Lotsy. He was a civilian, and therefore got Captain-lt B.G. Escher as director-general, later designated as inspector and adviser. Lotsy started with a general memo against insubordination that made a bad impression on the corps. Later he changed the payment of the rank and file of the navy from three-monthly to monthly. On 16 December 1856 the king made an important decision on corporal punishment in the navy, something that deterred many nationals from serving. The ship of the line Kortenaar was moved to Willemsoord, and became the new guard ship there. On 25 April 1857 the education of midshipman on board that ship became a royal institute.

While the Dutch Navy was still busy acquiring the first wooden screw steam ships of the plan 1855, the Battle of Kinburn had shown that these were not quite adequate. The floating battery pointed to a new course, that of armoring ships. On 1 September 1857 the Dutch navy had one screw frigate, two (three) screw corvettes, three small screw vessels and 15 steam paddle ships. It was probably on account of the developments in armor that Lotsy busied himself primarily with building the smaller ships of the plan. By the end of 1857 a second frigate with auxiliary power, the first Evertsen-class frigate had been launched, and a floating battery was under construction. Lotsy then got a slightly higher sum for building the second dry dock in Willemsoord. It was the affair that had ended the career of his predecessor, and proved Lotsy's political skill.

From 1857 to 1860 the Dutch navy deployed a squadron in the Mediterranean. It was a show of force and activity, certainly when in 1860 the frigates with auxiliary power Wassenaar, Evertsen and Zeeland sailed as a squadron for some time. Nevertheless, Lotsy's policy was widely disapproved in the media. Especially his statement that "the days of greatness and glory at sea were a thing of the past" was widely disliked. Meanwhile, Lotsy succeeded in securing the funds for action. On 15 May 1859 the budget for the navy rose to an unheard of 10,249,025 guilders. By the time that Lotsy resigned in March 1861, the fleet had been vastly improved. There were five floating batteries, three steam frigates, ten screw steam ships, and twelve small steam ships. Also the dry dock at Willemsoord had been repaired and the new dry dock had been finished. After his dismissal King William made Lotsy a Minister of State, a distinction awarded for merit.

Lotsy was also minister of finance ad interim and minister of colonies ad interim for a few months in 1861.

== Other activity ==
Early in life Lotsy wrote De Warande van Tilburg verdedigd. Een bijdrage tot het Jagtrecht. Pleitrede met Bijlagen (1840). It was a speech he made in court in a case in 1839. In local politics Lotsy was instrumental in founding the gymnasium in Dordrecht.

== Family ==
Lotsy was married to Perina Cornelia Storm van 's Gravesande. They had six children. Lotsy died on 4 April 1863 after a four-week illness. He was buried in silence at the cemetery Oud Eik en Duinen on 10 April. Lotsy's oldest son Karel Johannes Julianus Lotsy (1837-1905) founded the N.V. Brandverzekerings Maatschappij "Holland van 1859" in Dordrecht.

== Notes ==
Political offices
Preceded by Abraham Johannes de Smit van den Broecke (interim)	Minister of the Navy; 1856-1861	Succeeded by Willem Huyssen van Kattendijke
Preceded by Jan Jacob Rochussen	Minister of Colonial Affairs (interim); 1861	Succeeded by Jean Pierre Cornets de Groot van Kraaijenburg
