= HNLMS Medusa =

HNLMS Medusa may refer to the following ships of the Royal Netherlands Navy:

- HNLMS Van Speijk (1842), a corvette, also known as Medusa
- HNLMS Medusa (1854), the lead ship of the Medusa-class corvettes, which were equipped with auxiliary steam power
- HNLMS Medusa (1911), a minelayer
