= Evertsen-class frigate =

Dutch class of steam frigates

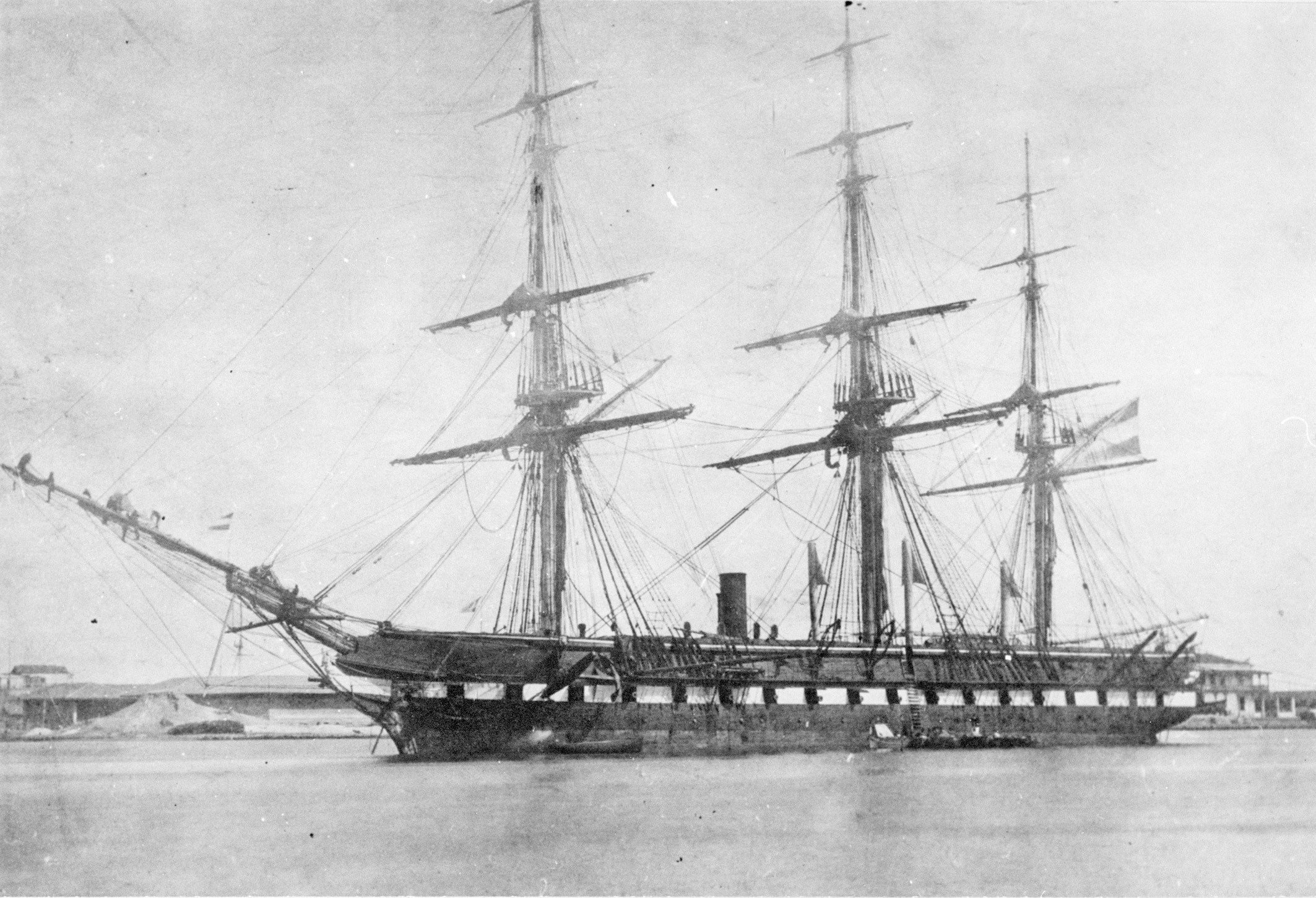
- Frigate Zeeland (1859–1883)

Class overview
- Name: Evertsen class
- Builders: Rijkswerf Vlissingen
- Operators: Royal Netherlands Navy
- In service: 1 June 1858
- Planned: 2
- Completed: 2
- Scrapped: 2

General characteristics
- Type: Steam Frigate
- Displacement: 3,375 tons
- Length: 63.50 m (208 ft 4 in)
- Beam: 15.70 m (51 ft 6 in)
- Draught: 6.80 m (22 ft 4 in)
- Installed power: 400 nominal horsepower; 1,000 indicated horsepower (750 kW)
- Speed: 8 knots. (machines only)
- Complement: 500
- Armour: ship made of wood

The Evertsen class was a class of steam frigates of the Royal Netherlands Navy. The class comprised Evertsen and Zeeland

== Dutch Naval Plans in the 1850s ==
=== Plan 1852: First reaction to the screw ===
The first coherent Dutch reaction to the appearance of screw driven warships was the plan 1852. It was a plan conceived by a commission of naval officers and augmented by the secretary for the navy. It led to orders to construct four ships in November 1852. These were: the screw frigate Wassenaar, the two screw corvettes of the Medusa class, and one screw schooner (Montrado). This was a plan to start the construction of screw driven warships. When a second expensive screw frigate (the Evertsen) was laid down in late 1854, the Dutch house of representatives was deeply worried by the apparent demise of the Dutch navy and the absence of a plan to make her effective again.

=== Plan 1855 ===
On 8 February 1855 Smit van den Broecke became the new Dutch Secretary for the navy. In May 1855 Smit van den Broecke presented an overall plan for the fleet at home and in the East Indies. The heaviest ships of the new fleet would be 3 screw steam frigates of 400 hp, 50 guns and 500 men, to be stationed in the Netherlands. The standard fighting warship for the East Indies would be a screw corvette of 250 hp, 12 30-pounders and 125 men, of which 12 would be built. For policing the many outposts in the Indies 15 sloops of 100 hp, 12 guns and 85 men would be built. These would be supplemented by small paddle ships that would navigate rivers and shallow waters. The ships of the Evertsen class fitted the 400 hp screw frigates of this plan.

== Characteristics of the Evertsen class ==
The ships of the Evertsen class were heavy frigates with auxiliary power. The prime objective of the designers of screw ships with auxiliary power was to create a steam ship with a full broadside. This led to screw frigates that were basically slightly longer versions of their sail only counterparts, the extra length being used for machinery and coal storage. Even so, the equivalent broadside was difficult to achieve. Weight had to be saved on engines and coal storage, and so these ships were intended to use their engines only in fights and emergencies, and to sail the rest of the time.

=== Design ===
The Evertsen class were the first frigates of the Dutch navy which were designed to have (auxiliary) steam power. At the time that the lead ship Evertsen was laid down the Dutch did not yet have a sailing frigate in commission, and therefore lacked any proof that either the previous lengthened sail frigate Wassenaar or the Evertsen would be successful. The Evertsen was only 1.14 meters longer than the previous Wassenaar, i.e. 1.8%. The beam of the Evertsen was 1.4 meters wider, amounting to an almost 10% increase in beam. This sudden increase in width of the Dutch heavy frigates from 14.30 m to 15.70 m seems a strange development.

Lieutenant H. Huijgens was a teacher in steam engineering at the Naval Institute in Medemblik. In 1847 he published an introduction to naval steam engineering (Dutch: Handleiding tot de kennis van het Scheeps-Stoomwerktuig). In 1852 he published: De Schroef (the Screw), a work about screw propulsion. In 1853 he published: De schroef-machine (the screw-machine). In the introduction to the screw-machine Huygens clearly states that before ordering the construction of screw-machines for the new warships with auxiliary power, the secretary for the navy ordered him to investigate the subject in England. The investigation was to concern which kind of machines and screws the English thought most effective, and what kind of improvements had been made to steam machines in recent times. The findings would give directions for equipping the ships with machines and screws, and aid in an attempt to make ships that were equal to foreign ships in every aspect. Later Huygens would repeat the investigation in company of the chief-engineer Tromp. Tromp was responsible for ship construction, Huygens for machinery. In the final sentence of the introduction Huygens stated that it would describe the machinery for the Medusa, Amelia and Wassenaar. Machines that were already under construction.

Huygens would end the report of his first visit to England with the sentence: We cannot rival the English in number of ships, but we should at least try to rival them in the capacities (hoedanigheid) of our ships. In his work The Screw Huygens stated: We believe that the best course is to follow other, bigger countries without experimenting to see what's good, but to use their experiments, and so to keep up with these other countries as much as possible. On his second trip to England Huygens visited the frigate with auxiliary power Imperieuse, the steam corvette Highflyer of 250 hp, the screw ship of the line Duke of Wellington, the Conflict of 8 guns and 400 hp, the transport Vulcan, the Tribune of 32 guns and 300 hp, the Plumper etc. etc. He mentioned all these in his book, but he only described the Highflyer 250 hp and the Imperieuse of 360 hp. The Euryalus, a sister ship of the Imperieuse had 400 hp. Therefore there can be little doubt that these two ships: the frigate Euryalus of 400 hp and the steam corvette Highflyer, can be considered to be the types of the 1855 program, at least with respect to machinery. In 1855 Huygens published: Schroef-stoomschepen as a 4th appendix to Handleiding tot de kennis van het Scheeps-Stoomwerktuig. In Schroefstoomschepen, published in the same year as the Plan 1855, Huygens compared the frigates of the 1855 program to the Imperieuse and Euryalus. His conclusion was that the Dutch frigates had the same power to displacement ratio, i.e. 1 : 8. (400 hp to 3,200 t displacement), that the English ships had done well in service and had sometimes achieved 9–10 knots. He compared the 250 hp corvettes of the plan 1855 with the light frigate Tribune of 300 hp. Huygens then declared that from a steam-mechanical point of view the ships of the plan were completely in line with contemporary technical standards.

The resemblance of the Evertsen to the British Imperieuse class, e.g. Euryalus, is striking at first sight. Evertsen length 63.5, beam 15.70, depth 6.80, displacement 3,300t, 400 nominal hp, 1000 ihp. Euryalus length 65, beam 15.29, depth 5.11, displacement 3,125t, 400 nominal hp 1159 ihp. However equal these ships were in outward appearances, their capabilities differed significantly. Under steam the Imperieuse class attained almost 10 knots. The Evertsen ran closer to 8 knots. Considering the difference between the United Kingdom and the Netherlands in naval budget, engineering- and design capabilities this is no surprise.

=== Armament ===
The armament of the Evertsen consisted of 51 guns.

=== Propulsion ===
The Evertsen class had machines of 400 nominal horsepower.

=== Names ===
The Evertsen was officially called Evertsen, but sometimes she was also referred to as Admiraal Evertsen.

== Ships in the class ==
Both ships were built by the Rijkswerf Vlissingen.

Name	Laid down	Launched	Commissioned	Fate
Evertsen	25 October 1854	21 Sep 1857	1 June 1858	Decommissioned 30 Sep 1920 as barracks ship Neptunus
Zeeland	28 February 1856	30 July 1859	1 April 1860	Unfit for sea Sep 1883
