= HNLMS D 1 =

World War II Dutch support vessel

History

Netherlands
- Name: D 1
- Builder: Rijkswerf Willemsoord, Den Helder
- Laid down: 18 mei 1938
- Launched: 6 December 1938
- Commissioned: 10 May 1939
- Decommissioned: 26 September 1989
- Renamed: HNLMS MOD 4 (1946–1964); HNLMS Argus (1964–1989)
- Fate: Sold to private buyer in 1989

General characteristics
- Type: Diving support vessel
- Displacement: 44.5 t (43.8 long tons) standard
- Length: 23 m (75 ft 6 in)
- Beam: 4.7 m (15 ft 5 in)
- Draught: 1.1 m (3 ft 7 in)
- Installed power: 144 hp (107 kW)
- Propulsion: 2 × Kromhout diesel engines
- Speed: 8 knots (15 km/h; 9.2 mph)
- Complement: 8

HNLMS D 1 was a Royal Netherlands Navy diving support vessel. She was constructed at the Rijkswerf Willemsoord in Den Helder and served in World War II. D 1 was an acronym for Duikvaartuig 1, Dutch for Diving vessel 1.

== Service history ==
D 1 was captured by the Germans on 14 May 1940 following the invasion of the Netherlands. She was rediscovered in 1946 and returned to the Royal Netherlands Navy where she was recommissioned as HNLMS MOD 4 from 1946 to 1964 and HNLMS Argus from 1964 to 1989. In 1989 she was sold to a private buyer with the intent of using her as a yacht.
