= Abraham Johannes de Smit van den Broecke =

Royal Dutch Navy officer

Minister of the Navy
- In office 8 February 1855 – 1 August 1856
- Monarch: William III
- Preceded by: H.F.C. Forstner van Dambenoy
- Succeeded by: Johannes Servaas Lotsy

Personal details
- Born: 13 May 1801 Aardenburg
- Died: 1 January 1875 (aged 73) Oost-Souburg

Abraham Johannes de Smit van den Broecke (Aardenburg, 13 May 1801 – Oost-Souburg, 1 January 1875) was a career officer of the Royal Dutch Navy and a conservative minister for the navy.

== Early life ==
Abraham Johannes de Smit van den Broecke was born on 13 May 1801. His parents were Abraham van den Broecke (1768–1840), mayor of Aardenburg and Adriana Jacoba de Jonge (1777–1835). Abraham's eldest brother Servaas (1798–1863) would become a notary like his father. The second brother Jacobus Cornelis (1799–1870) would become famous as a medical doctor. The third older brother Hendrik (1800–1866) became a merchant. A younger brother Philippus made career as a lawyer.

At age 13 Abraham went to the Kweekschool voor de Zeevaart in Amsterdam in 1814. This was a boarding school for naval education. It's remarkable that Abraham was sent to the navy so young instead of going to university like his brothers. Early on he would succeed in making everybody refer to him by the double name De Smit van den Broecke, using his third given name as part of a new family name. This instead of simply being named Van den Broecke like his more successful brothers.

== Career in the navy ==
=== Early service ===
In August 1815 Abraham van den Broecke joined the navy as a midshipman. In 1826 he was mentioned as A.J. de Smit van den Broecke, 'extraordinary lieutenant 2nd class'. In 1828 he was a regular lieutenant 2nd class. In December 1832 he commanded gunboat no. 79 near Vlissingen. On 5 April 1834 De Smit van den Broecke became a lieutenant 1st class. In 1835 he was on the ship Snelheid, making a visit to New York. He had a few lines describing him in an American newspaper. In July 1839 De Smit van den Broecke served on the steam vessel Cerberus and temporarily commanded her near Hellevoetsluis.

On 1 October 1840 lieutenant 1st class De Smit van den Broecke got his first official command of a ship when he was appointed as commander of the Cerberus. On 13 September 1842 he became commander of the steam vessel Bromo.

=== Commanding the warship Bromo in the East Indies ===
In 1844 de Smit van den Broecke sailed to the Dutch East Indies in command of the Bromo. In March 1845 an experiment with using coal from Banjarmasin instead of European coal was held on board the Bromo. On 6 December 1845 he became a captain lieutenant. In June 1846 De Smit van den Broecke was in the Dutch intervention in northern Bali (1846). Here he commanded the landing division, and a record of his actions was published. On account of the expedition against Bali De Smit van den Broecke became a knight 3rd class in the Military Order of William in December 1846. In January 1848 De Smit van den Broecke sailed the Bromo towards home, and in May 1848 he arrived in Hellevoetsluis.

=== Commanding on the North Sea ===
On 1 April 1849 de Smit van den Broecke became commander of the steam vessel Cycloop. In May the Cycloop sailed to London. On board were Prince Henry of the Netherlands (1820–1879), his ADC Ridder van Rappard, VA Lucas and Lt-Colonel Rigot de Bignins. They all visited a ball in Buckingham Palace with about 1,900 invites. In May 1850 the Cycloop conducted spring maneuvers near the coast, shooting with cannon and hand weapons. On 16 April 1851 de Smit van den Broecke changed to the new steam vessel Gedeh. After making a trial run on 28 May 1851, he sailed from Vlissingen to London on 29 May. In London Prince Henry came on board again, and on 11 June they arrived back in Hellevoetsluis. After some uneventful cruises in the North Sea and along the coast, de Smit van den Broecke was promoted by seniority to captain on 1 January 1852. In January 1852 de Smit van den Broecke was to sail the Gedeh to the West Indies in order to collect the crew of the unfit brig Amphitrite. However, before the Gedeh sailed again, De Smit van den Broecke resigned the command and became inactive on 1 February.

=== Commanding the frigate Doggersbank ===
In January 1852 There was a rumor that captain de Smit van den Broecke would get the command of the heavy frigate Doggersbank, a ship more fitting for a captain. This appointment indeed took place on 24 February, effective 1 April. On 13 June 1852 the Doggersbank tried to leave Nieuwediep for Vlissingen, but was blown back. A few days later she was towed to Vlissingen. The mission of the Doggersbank was to make a cruise to the Canaries as an exercise trip for 40 midshipmen. On 23 June she left Vlissingen, and on 8 July she was in A Coruña, from whence the Reales Astilleros de Esteiro were visited. On 2 August the Doggersbank arrived back in Nieuwediep from the Canaries. In September the Doggersbank was the flagship of a squadron under RA Bouricius together with the frigate Prins van Oranje, the corvette Sumatra and the Gedeh. The squadron arrived in Gibraltar on 10 October. It left from there in mid October and sailed to Cadiz. From there the two frigates sailed home on 6 November, and arrived back in Nieuwediep on the 18th.

Meanwhile de Smit van den Broecke had been appointed in the 1852 commission for Naval affairs. It had been appointed on 14 February 1852 to advise the minister for the navy about 'some naval affairs'. In it were Prince Henry as LA and president, R.A. S.R. van Franck, captain de Smit van den Broecke, captain-lts C.J. Berghuis and B.G. Escher, lieutenants 1st class J.C. Pieterse and H. Camp, Chief-Engineer A.E. Tromp, engineer 2nd class H.G. Jansen, and administrative officer J.E. Kempe. The commission had to answer a lot of questions. The most important question was whether the navy should use screw-propulsion. This question was answered in the affirmative, and led to the construction of the first big Dutch warships with screw propulsion.

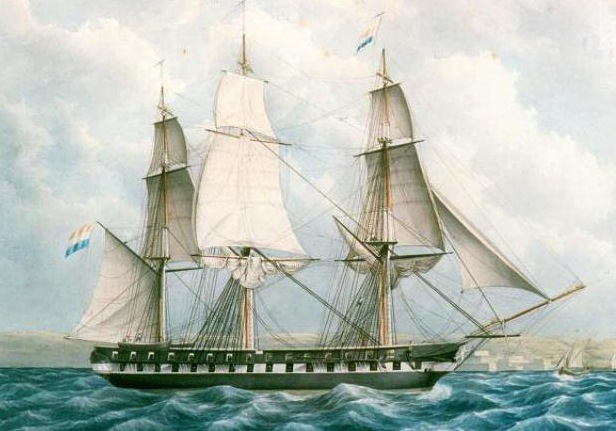
Frigate Doggersbank in the Mediterranean 1853

In late January 1853 de Smit van den Broecke took the Doggersbank on a cruise to the Mediterranean. She first left Nieuwediep for Malta, where she arrived on 8 February. On 15 February the Doggersbank left Malta, and on 19 February she reached Smyrna (Turkey). She next sailed to Istanbul, but had to visit Scio after losing sails and anchors. In mid-March she reached Istanbul, from whence she was to return to the Netherlands in mid-April. In fact she returned to Smyrna, and from there reached Alexandria on 27 April. From there she sailed to Malta, and left there on 30 May. On 29 June De Smit van den Broecke arrived back in Den Helder on board the Doggersbank. On 5 August he sailed her to Vlissingen, where she would be cleaned of an infection causing Gas gangrene in very minor wounds. On 6 October 1853 the Doggersbank arrived back in Nieuwediep.

At the end of 1853 de Smit van den Broecke made a second trip to the Mediterranean on board the Doggersbank. After the Doggersbank had been loaded with a half year's provisions, the planned trip was postponed. On 1 November 1853 de Smit van den Broecke finally sailed her out of Texel for the Mediterranean. On 25 November 1853 she reached Malta. Here she was joined by the Prins van Oranje, and together they left for Messina and Naples on 17 December. On 2 February 1854 both arrived in Genoa. On 25 February she arrived in Malta. On 7 March she left Malta for Smyrna, arriving there on 21 March. On 12 June the Doggersbank stranded near Smyrna. In mid August she arrived back in Malta. On 10 October 1854 the Doggersbank arrived in Vlissingen, from whence she continued to Texel. By 10 December 1854 De Smit van den Broecke was known to have been placed on the Guard ship Rijn in Nieuwediep.

== Political career ==
=== Interest in politics ===
Already in November 1848 de Smit van den Broecke had got a lot of votes to become a candidate for the House of Representatives. One can therefore assume that next to being interested in politics, he did have some charisma. However, he declined to be on the list. Instead he continued his career in the navy.

=== Minister of the Navy ===
In early January 1855, only a few week after returning to the Netherlands with the Doggersbank, rumors that De Smit van den Broecke would become the next minister of the navy became public. On 8 February 1855 De Smit van den Broecke became minister for the navy instead of minister of war lt-general Forstner van Dambenoy, who had held the office ad interim.

=== Plan 1855 ===
In early May 1855 de Smit van den Broecke presented the final budget for 1855, proposing to raise the budget by 2,116,645 guilders to 7,575,963 guilders. Of the budget increase 1,457,157 was earmarked for materiel, construction and repair of ships. The final budget was presented together with a memo called 'Stelsel voor de Nederlandsche Marine', translated as 'Plan 1855'. According to the previous minister and many members of the House of Representatives, the navy had been in serious decline for years. There was also a feeling that several ministers for the navy had spent money on very different priorities, and that without prioritization and consistent planning the navy would not recover. The memo was called a 'stelsel' or system, and was a plan also meant to alleviate these worries.

Plan 1855 was an overall plan for the fleet at home and in the East Indies. In times of peace the fleet would consist of 4 screw steam frigates with auxiliary power of 400 hp, 50 guns and 500 men, to be stationed in the Netherlands. The standard fighting warship for the East Indies would be a screw corvette of 250 hp, 12 30-pounders and 125 men, of which 17 were needed. For policing the many outposts in the Indies 15 sloops of 100 hp, 12 guns and 85 men were required. These would be supplemented by small paddle ships that would navigate rivers and shallow waters. For times of war 16 more screw frigates, 5 screw corvettes and 3 more sloops should be kept in reserve.

Naval construction would not adhere to plan 1855 for more than a few years. Five years later the concept of auxiliary steam power was outdated. The first sloops were built with 119 hp. They would soon be found to be too expensive for their designated tasks and so a class of sloops significantly lighter than 100 hp was built. Furthermore the concept of nominal hp did not give a good indication of power. Finally the advent of the Ironclad warship during the Battle of Kinburn (1855) would soon make the wooden warship obsolete. Nevertheless the plan was successful in securing funds and political consensus to start and continue regular construction of a respectable fleet of screw steam ships. On 19 December 1855 de Smit van den Broecke was promoted to rear admiral effective 1 January 1856.

=== Willemsoord Dry Dock II, end of his ministry ===
By early 1856 the Dutch navy had a serious problem with dry dock capacity. Hellevoetsluis Dry Dock was too small for the screw corvettes and old sailing frigates. Vlissingen Navy Drydock could be used for these, but was not fit for the screw frigates of Plan 1855. Willemsoord Dry Dock I could be perhaps be used for these screw frigates, but then only by unloading them. The acute problem was that Willemsoord Dry Dock I was out of order since 1849. Despite doubts about the suitability of the grounds, De Smit van den Broecke's predecessors had spent much money in a failed attempt to repair it.

In April 1856 De Smit van den Broecke then proposed a budget law requesting 200,000 guilders for a new dry dock in Willemsoord, the later Willemsoord Dry Dock II. The reason for the new dry dock was that all exisintg dry docks were too small for the new screw frigates. The house of representatives wanted the minister to buy a floating dock, partly out of worry that a dug-out dry-dock would lead to a repetition of the problems of the existing leaky Willemsoord Dry Dock I. (Which would later indeed prove to be the case.)

After the minister refused to withdraw the bill, it was refused by 38 to 14 votes. De Smit van den Broecke then tendered his resignation to the king, but was persuaded to remain in office for the moment. On 23 June 1856 Donker-Curtius, De Smit van den Broecke and two more ministers were dismissed. On 1 July the cabinet Van Hall-Donker Curtius fell, and was replaced by the Cabinet Van der Brugghen. De Smit van den Broecke stayed on as minister for the navy ad interim, but did not take part in the meetings of the council of ministers, and could no longer be considered a minister. He was replaced by J.S. Lotsy on 1 August.

== Family ==
On 14 September 1838 De Smit van den Broecke married Catharina Christina Abrahams. They got a son on 16 March 1843. On 31 May 1849 they got a daughter.

== See also ==
Political offices
Preceded by H.F.C. Forstner van Dambenoy (interim)	Minister of the Navy; 1855-1856	Succeeded by Johannes Servaas Lotsy
