= Willemsoord, Den Helder =

Maritime museum in the Netherlands

Willemsoord
- Rijkswerf Willemsoord
- Den Helder, North Holland in Netherlands
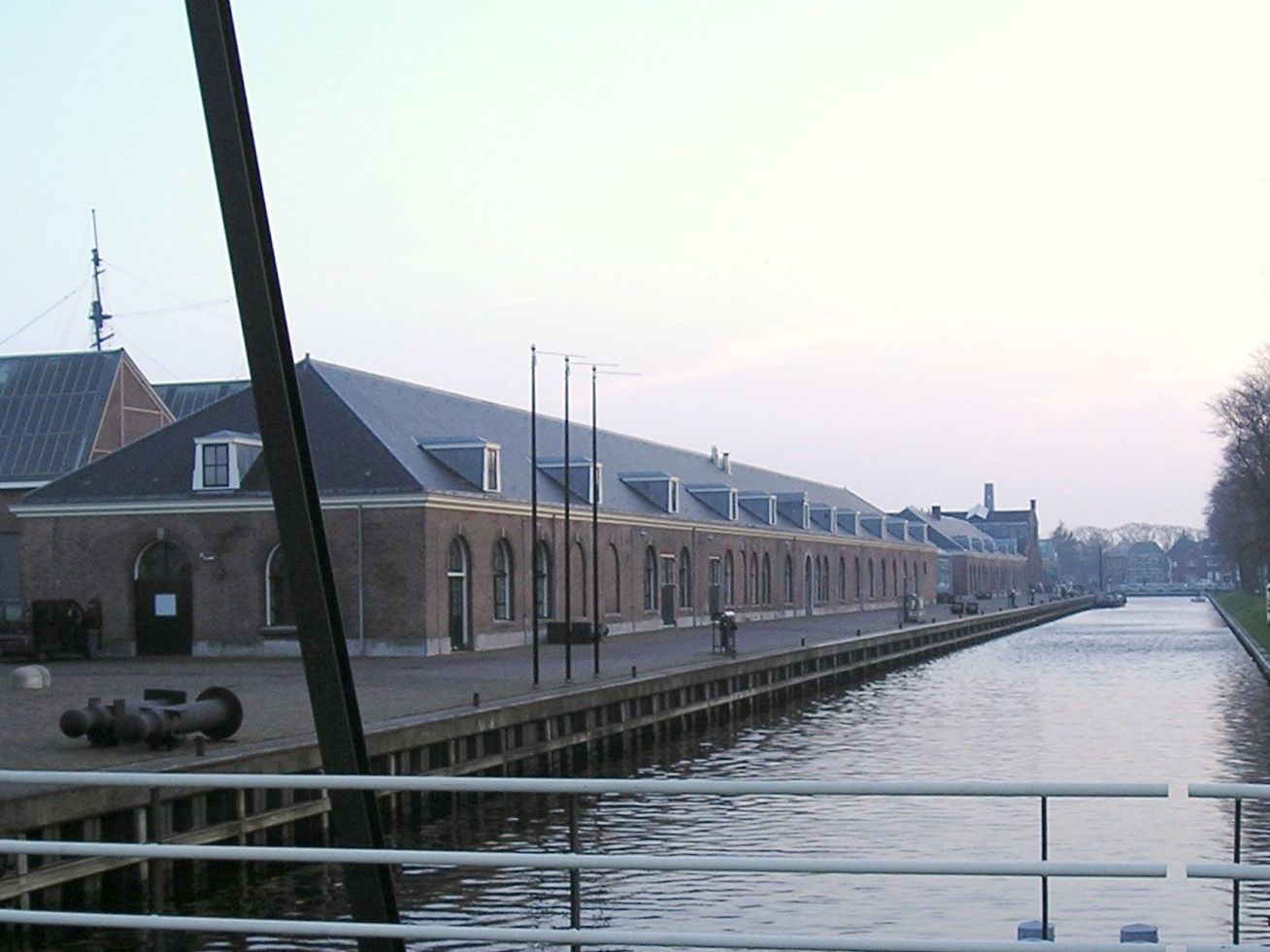
- Monumental buildings at Willemsoord

Site information
- Type: Naval base
- Owner: Den Helder municipality
- Operator: Royal Netherlands Navy (former)
- Open to the public: Yes, Maritime attraction park
- Condition: Defunct
- Website: Official website

Location
- Coordinates: 52.961023°N 4.771881°E

Site history
- Built: 1790
- In use: 1792 – 2000
- Battles/wars: 1799 Anglo-Russian invasion, 1813 Siege of Den Helder

Willemsoord is a large former naval base of the Royal Netherlands Navy in Den Helder. It is now connected to the city center of Den Helder, and focuses on entertainment and tourism.

== Nieuwediep harbor: Origin of the naval base ==
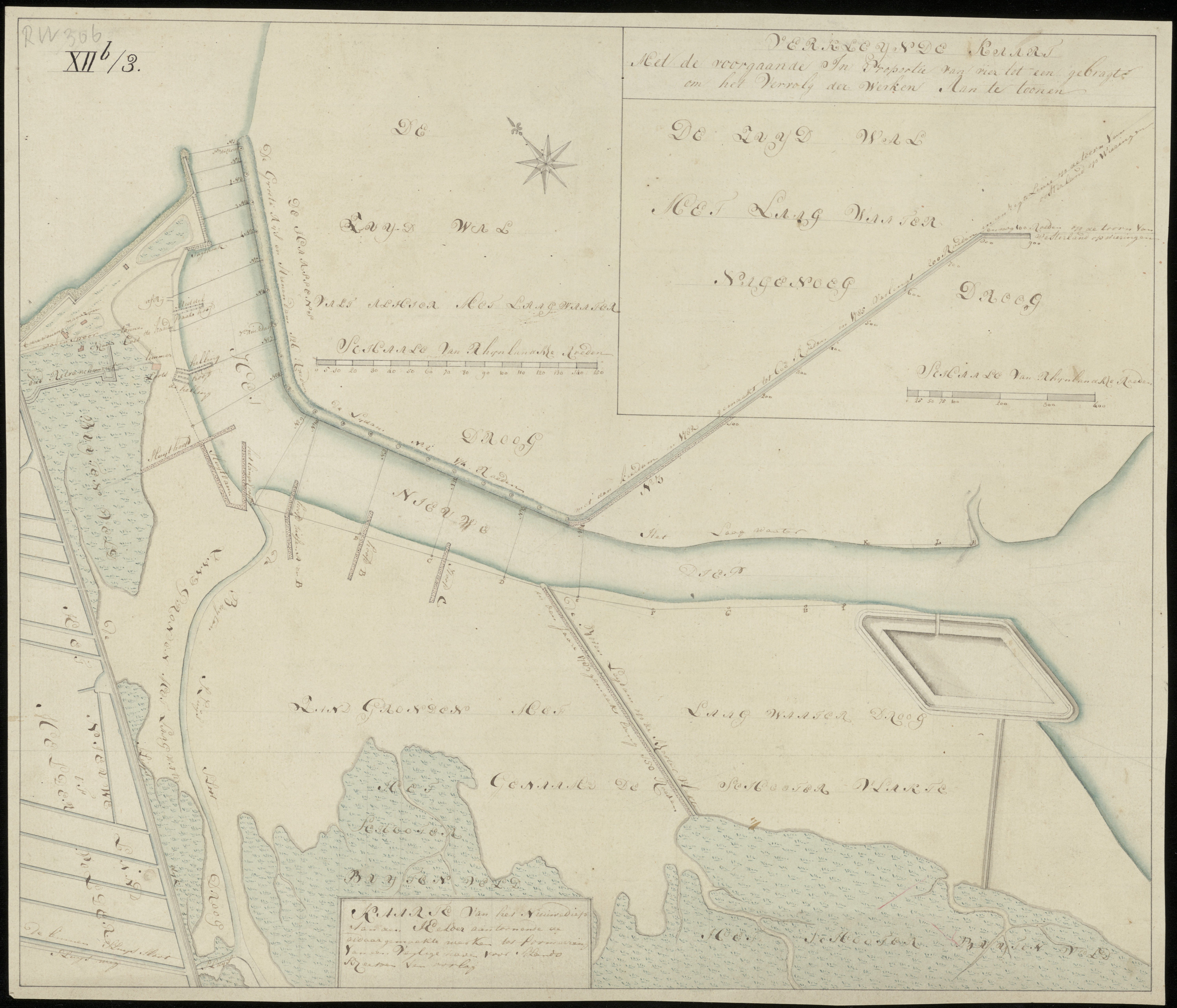
The dams and the Nieuwe Werk of 1792

In the seventeenth and eighteenth centuries, it became increasingly difficult for big ships to regularly sail to the Dutch cities on the Zuiderzee. Many ships therefore anchored in the Roadstead of Texel, where a lot of transloading was done by small ships that anchored safely in the Nieuwediep. The Nieuwediep was a stretch of deep water close to the coast near what would later become Den Helder, and was well protected by a shoal.

The importance of a safe base for the Dutch navy was stressed again by the Fourth Anglo-Dutch War. The Nieuwediep was an ideal location, but not deep enough for warships and East Indies ships. In August 1781 orders were given to deepen it. In order to achieve this, many dam were constructed, which guided the ebb flow through the Nieuwediep. This would also keep the Nieuwediep at depth.

In April 1783 the depth was enough for the first armed warships to anchor in the harbor. Works continued, and in 1783-1784 60-70 loaded ships wintered in Nieuwediep, safe from ice. In the winter of 1784-1785 there were 150 ships at Nieuwediep, among them heavy merchant men laying somewhat at the bottom of the harbor. In 1785-1786 the ships of the line wintered in Nieuwediep. Still, Nieuwediep was nothing more than a harbor. It lacked facilities like stores and repair shops, that would make it a real naval base.

== Nieuwe Werk, the first naval base ==
=== The Nieuwe Werk ===
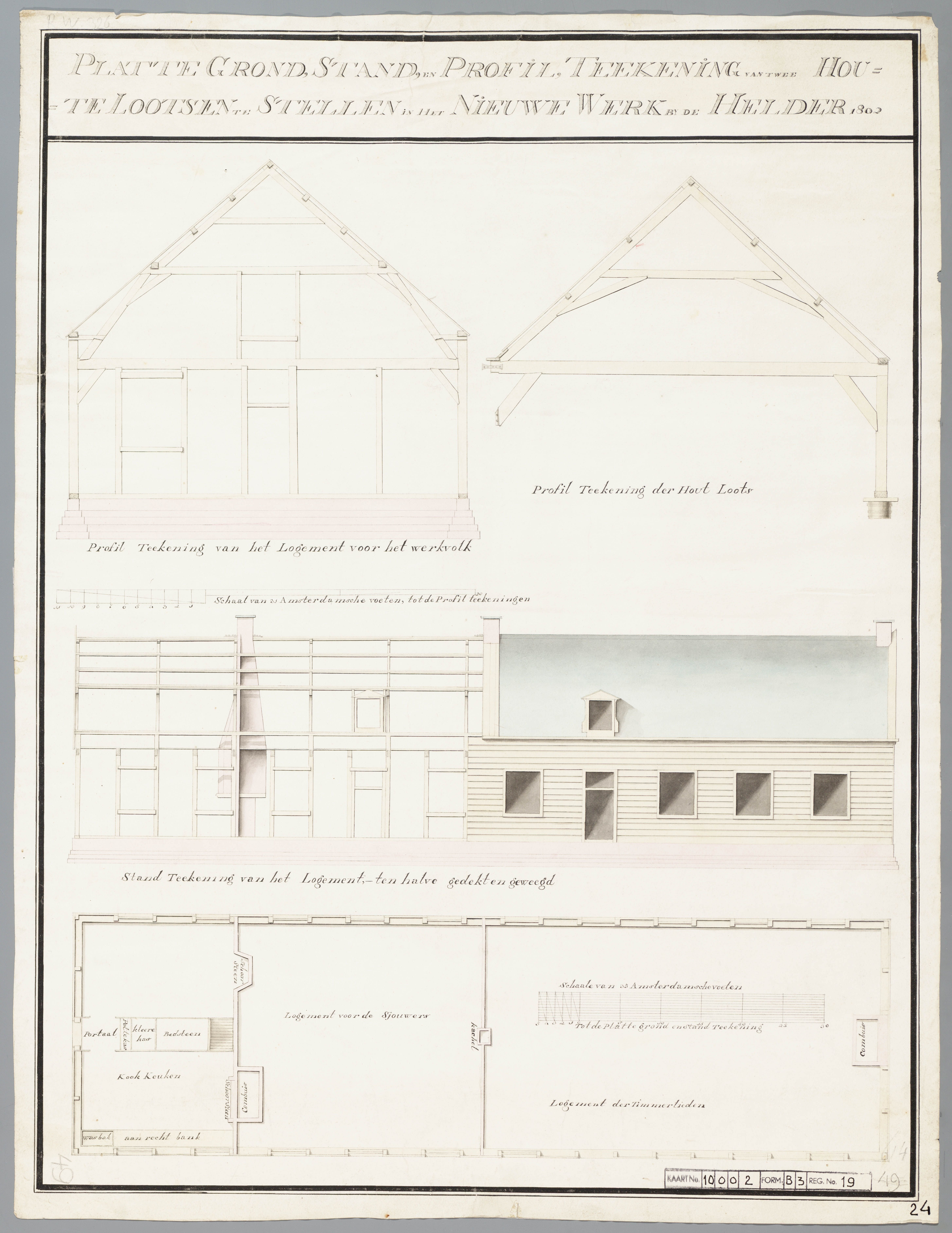
Design for housing on the Nieuwe Werk

In 1792 a repair facility called 'Het Nieuwe Werk' was founded. It was also called the 'Kielplaats' (Dutch for careening place). It had a state of the art lock. Ships could get in at high tide, and be pulled on their side at low tide and remain so till careening was finished. This was a very sensitive project. Careening was one thing, it was often done in all kinds of places. The logical follow up would be a repair shop with stores, something that the cities on the Zuiderzee (incl. Amsterdam) vehemently opposed. Of course they feared that one thing would lead to another, first a naval base with facilities, and then commerce itself flowing to Nieuwediep.

After the Batavian Revolution the national interest somewhat prevailed over local interests. On 20 July 1795 the national committee for the navy ordered the construction of a house, three wooden storehouses, and a building suitable for a smithy. All were to be erected within the confines of the Nieuwe Werk. Note that particular interests still succeeded in limiting the buildings. However, while one can suppose that the Nieuwe Werk was delayed by local interests, the financial situation of the admiralties was dire enough to lead to inactivity.

There is a description of the Nieuwe Werk at the end of the eighteenth century. It noted the lock of the Nieuwe Werk, and that a moat ran through the terrain, enabling ships to moor against the quay of the facility they needed to visit. The initial floor plan of the Nieuwe Werk suggests bigger plans.

At the time the description refers to, a number of cranes was present to assist the ships, at the places they needed to visit. There was a storehouse for guns, warehouses for rigging, wood etc., the smithy was on an 'island'. The house for the master of the work was southeast of the lock. There were also some houses for the school teacher, the lock keeper, and some of the workers. Most of the time, there were about 9 staff, 20-40 carpenters, 6 smiths, and 10-20 stevedores. These were kind of 'locked up' in the Nieuwe Werk, because it could only be reached at ebb. At the Nieuwe Werk many small vessels like launches, jolly boats, and boats were built. This activity went against the basic interests of the Zuiderzee harbors, but it employed their workers when there was nothing to repair.

=== Batteries ===
Also in 1792, some small field fortifications were made on the north side of the Nieuwediep. By 1793 there was a battery called Princes of Orange. It had 28 24-pounders and was situated on the Kaaphoofd, west of Den Helder. Between Den Helder and the Nieuwediep at the mouth of the Nieuwediep, there was a battery of 11 24-pounders called Erfprinses (later called 'Unie'). In 1793 there were also the guardship Prinses Louisa of 54 guns, the hulk Hyena with 20 18-pounders, and some gunboats.

=== The Anglo-Russian invasion ===
In 1799 the Anglo-Russian invasion of Holland led to the capture of Nieuwediep and the Nieuwe Werk on 29 August after both had been evacuated. By then the English found 95 guns and many supplies in the Nieuwe Werk. They also captured many ships: the ships of the line: Verwachting (66), Broederschap (55) and Hector (44); the frigates: Helder (32), Jollock (24), Minerva (24), Venus (24), Alarm (24) and the two-decks East Indies ships: Duifje (12), Expeditie (16), Constitutie (12), Schoone Antoinette (12), Unie (12) and four single-deck ships, all of them without crew. Seeing the Orange flags in Nieuwediep probably had a big influence on the Vlieter incident of 30 August. A Dutch fleet of eight ships of the line and four frigates, now separated from its base, mutinied and surrendered without firing a shot.

=== Den Helder gets fortified ===
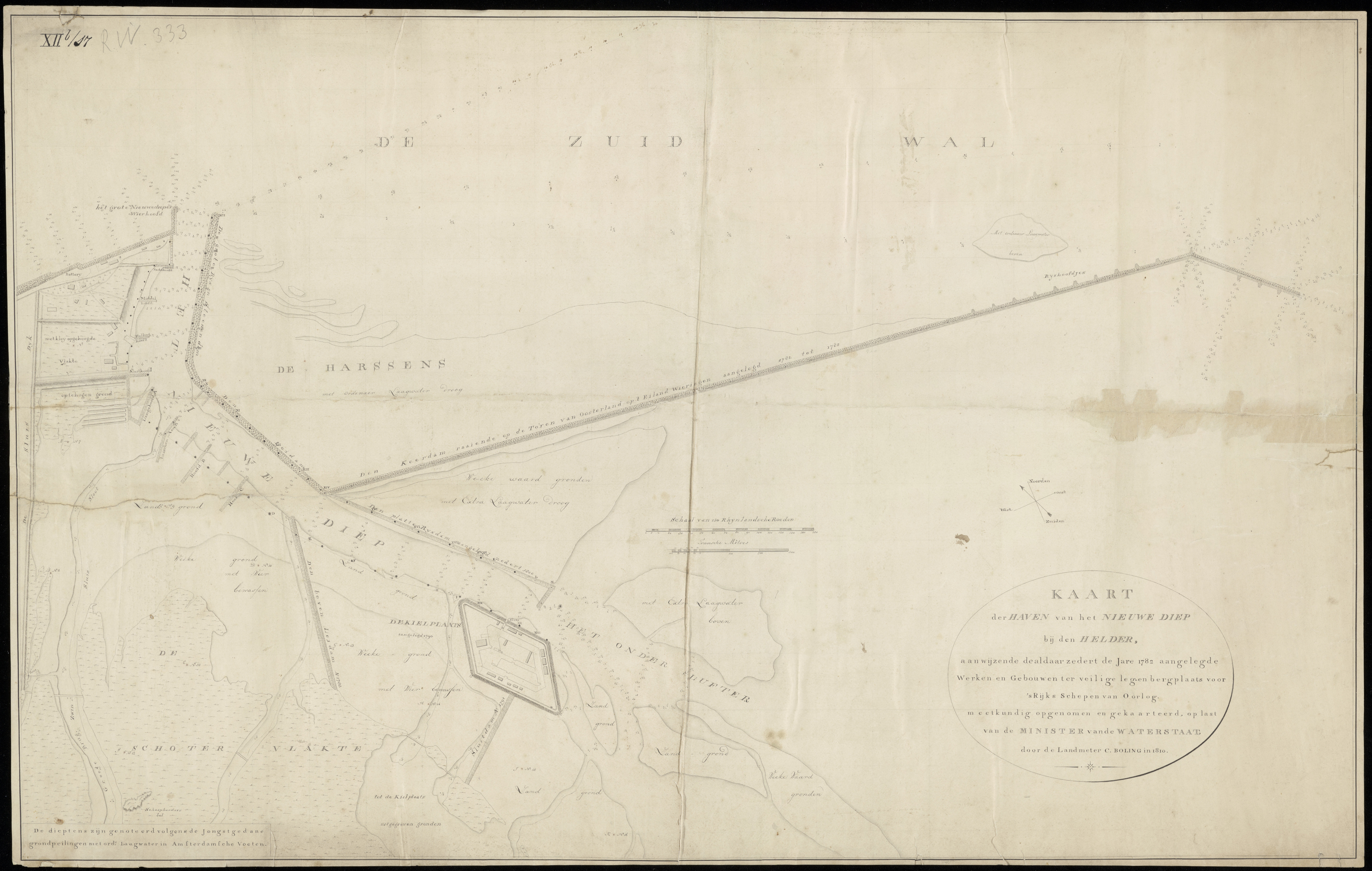
The Nieuwediep with the Battery and the Nieuwe Werk in 1810.

The Dutch authorities now realized that a fleet could only be safe in Nieuwediep if it was also protected on the land side. Already in 1803 the old village of Den Helder was fortified. The tip of the Nieuwediep (including battery De Unie) was somewhat surrounded by walls, and field fortifications were erected to protect the other coastal batteries on the land side. The Nieuwe Werk also got some guns. This was not enough to protect the base against a serious attack, but funds were limited. The light fortifications did not protect against a siege, but they did protect against a raid. In 1807 king Louis Bonaparte visited the base and also saw the potential of the position. Meanwhile, operations continued in Nieuwediep. Warehouses were restored etc.

=== Continued operation of the Nieuwe Werk till 1822 ===
From 1812 till 1815, a dyke was constructed on the western side of the Nieuwediep. It connected the Nieuwe Werk to the mouth of the Nieuwediep. When the independence of the Netherlands was re-established, the base of Nieuwediep continued as one of the national naval bases. This meant that the harbor and the 'Nieuwe Werk' continued in operation while the works on Willemsoord were in execution.

Meanwhile, activity at the Nieuwe Werk expanded. First small vessels were used to house the workers, but later the old ship of the line Zoutman became a barracks ship. 65 families were housed on the upper gun deck, while single workmen were housed on the lower decks. During its heyday the Nieuwe Werk would employ up to 700 men.

The Nieuwe Werk would continue in operation till about 1822. After Willemsoord was taken into use, the Nieuwe Werk was closed down. Part of the Nieuwe Werk was then changed to become Fort Oostoever.(when?) This was necessary, because of the land reclamation between the Nieuwe Werk and Fort Dirks Admiraal.

== Rijkswerf Willemsoord ==
=== Napoleon visits Nieuwediep ===
A design for Willemsoord

In 1811 Napoleon Bonaparte visited Den Helder. He concurred with all previous authorities that Nieuwediep had great strategic potential as a base. The difference between him and previous authorities was that he could spend much more. He ordered Jan Blanken Jansz. to build the biggest naval base and maintenance shipyard of the Netherlands. This would later become Willemsoord. The total cost would be 6,000,000 francs for the fortifications, and the same cost for the base and part of the works in Hellevoetsluis. Fortifying the position was the easy part. In a few years a bunch of strong fortresses and fortifications was established centering on Den Helder.

While work on a new base at what would later become Willemsoord was started in 1811, daily operations continued at the Nieuwe Werk. Napoleon gave an impulse to the Nieuwe Werk when he decreed that all repairs that could be done at Lorient (a harbor that like Nieuwediep had a strong current and no dock) should also be done in Nieuwediep. That is ships should not be sent to Medemblik for such repairs. In 1812 the ships of the line Zoutman and Prince were repaired in Nieuwediep while the crew was lodged on board the old East Indies ship Constitution.

=== Siege of Den Helder ===
In 1813 the fortifications of Den Helder were so powerful that the French were able to maintain themselves in Den Helder when the Dutch threw off the French yoke. It led to the Siege of Den Helder in November 1813. At the time the Dutch fleet in Den Helder, the so-called squadron of Texel consisted of; the ships of the line: Prince (80), Zoutman (80), De Ruyter (80), Evertsen (80) and Doggersbank; the frigates Meuse (44) and Ijssel (44) (both with French crews); the corvette Venus and the Brig Irene, as well as the French brig Iréne. In port and not ready were the ships of the line: Amsterdam (80), Brabant (76), Jean de Witt (68) and Rotterdam (68), and the frigates Aurora / Dageraad (32) and Maria Reijgersbergen (32). When the Bourbons were restored, the squadron of Texel came into Dutch hands again.

=== Willemsoord proper ===
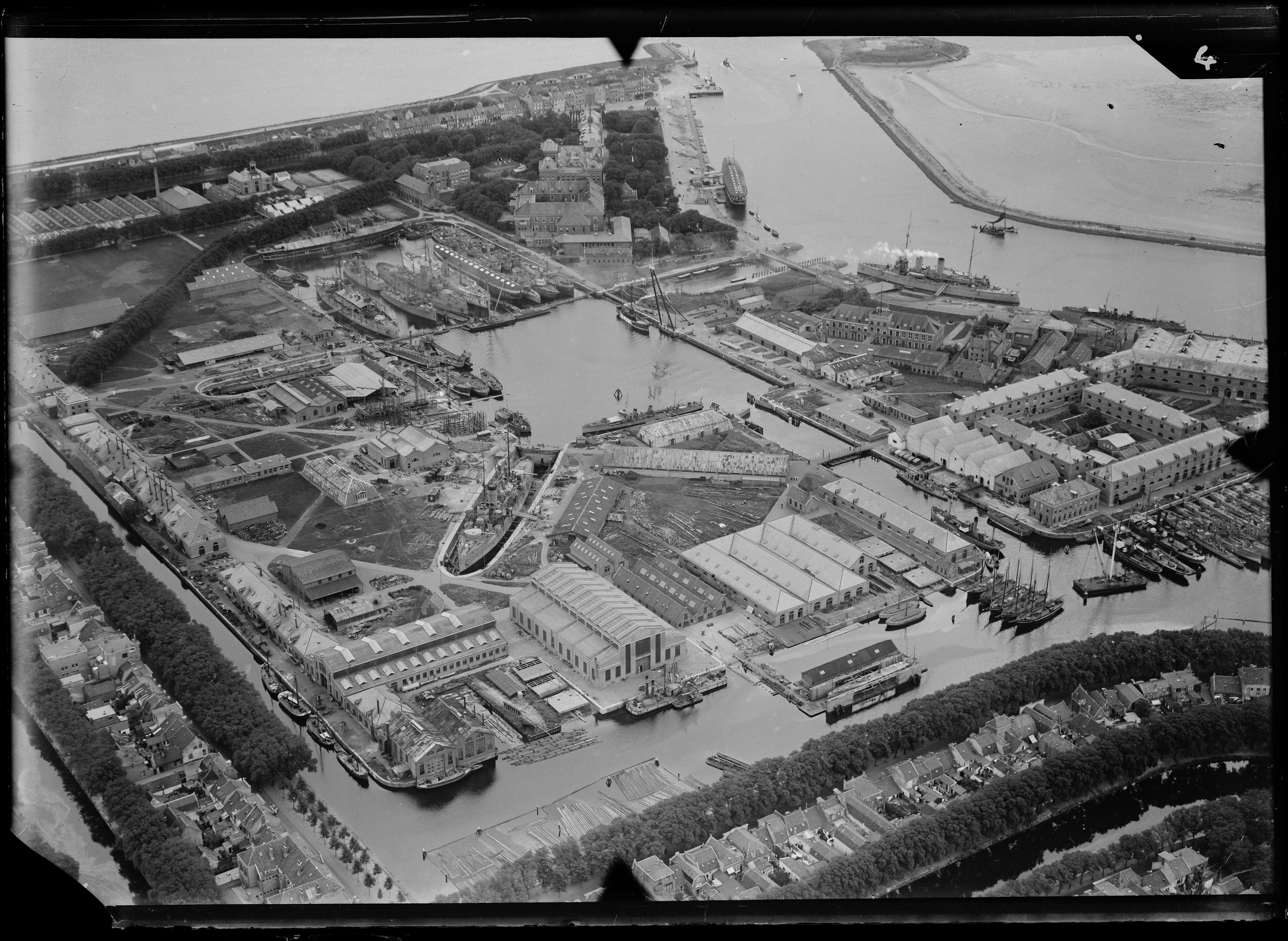
Willemsoord in full operation (1920–1940), the Nieuwediep is on the top right

The other part of Napoleon's orders encompassed the establishment of a much more serious naval base. Like Vlissingen and Hellevoetsluis the new base would have a wet dock and a dry dock. It would be situated right on the exit of the Nieuwediep, and design was ready in 1811. After the Netherlands regained their independence construction continued, and the new base got the name Willemsoord. The base was generally known as 'Rijkswerf Willemsoord'. What set her apart from the other shipyards designated as 'Rijkswerf' was that she was primarily a maintenance and equipment shipyard. Ships that were built at the 'Rijkswerf Amsterdam' would receive their masts, rigging, provisions etc. etc. in Willemsoord. Only a few very minor ships would be built in Willemsoord.

In 1822 the first buildings were ready: Dry Dock I, Wet Dock, Sea Sluice, Pump House (with steam engine) and Werfkanaal (Yard Canal).

A second wave of construction took place between 1857 and 1866. It comprised the construction of Dry Dock II and a new Pump Building.

In the first half of the 20th century the Workbench building, the Kettle factory, the shipmakers workplace, the rigging and sailmakers workshop, magazines and other workshops were built. In 1992 the navy was moving its last? shipyard activities to the Nieuwe Haven.

== City Quarter Willemsoord ==
=== Willemsoord becomes a maritime attraction park ===
Between 1992 and 1995 the municipality of Den Helder made the first concepts for future use of the Willemsoord terrains. The first idea was to make Willemsoord a museum. Later plans opted for a combination of housing, business, tourist attraction and water related recreational activities. This would be done while preserving the atmosphere and historic value of Willemsoord. In 1994 the masterplan 'The Netherlands Overseas' (Nederland Overzee) was made that included a maritime theme park. Some aspects like the presence of 19th century ships, and maritime activities were realized. The plan also envisioned the creation of new buildings evoking (the trade relations with) other countries, an idea targeted at attracting more visitors. In fact the plan opted to build an enormous amount of houses on the terrain, especially around the docks. The national monument service opposed the projected houses around the docks, and the plan was dismissed.

In 1997 a new plan was made, focusing on museums, recreation and culture. The leisure company Libéma was hired to organize the tourism part. Atelier Quadrat then made a new masterplan. It focused on experiencing Willemsoord as a single planned structure. All non monumental buildings would have to be removed. The western side would have to be seen as a coherent block, and only two entrances were envisioned. In order to experience the industrial character, there would be no roads, street names or sidewalks, and everything would be paved with the original clinker bricks.

On 29 April 2004 Willemsoord, the restored south west corner, and theme park Cape Holland were opened for the public. For several reasons there were less visitors than expected. Combined with a focus on visitors from outside Den Helder, it was awkwardly quiet at times. Therefore, plans were adjusted to also draw visitors from Den Helder and surroundings. This gave a more solid base for facilities at Willemsoord. Willemsoord became a regular quarter of Den Helder, albeit with a strong focus on culture, entertainment and tourism.

=== Museums ===
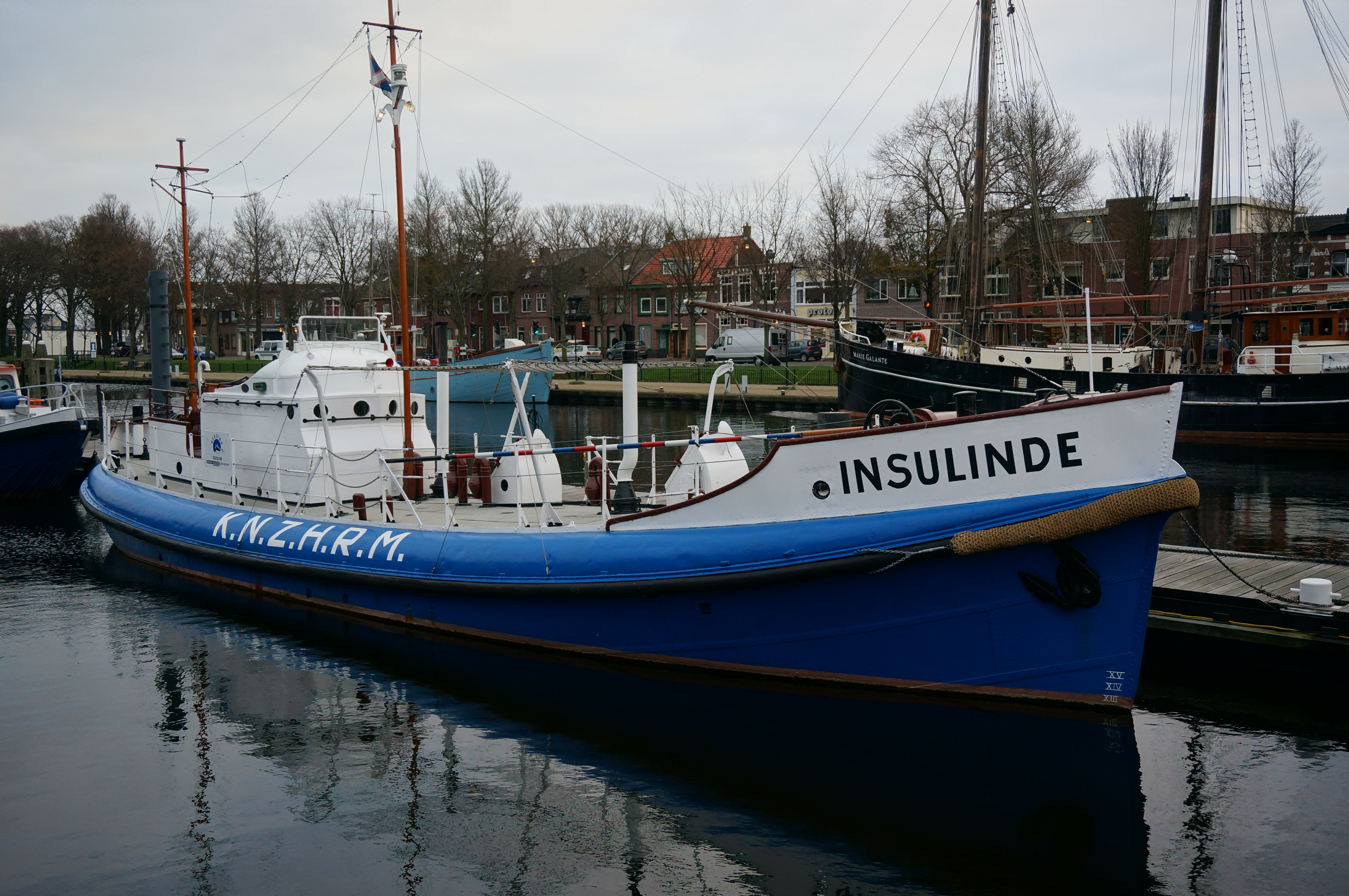
Insulinde

As former home of the Dutch Navy, Willemsoord (still) houses the Dutch Navy Museum. Next to the indoor collection it has the ironclad ram Schorpioen (1868), submarine Tonijn (1965), and gunvessel Bonaire (1877). In 2003 the National Sea Rescue Museum Dorus Rijkers moved to Willemsoord, which have it took to display its five historic lifeboats, including the famous Insulinde (1927), the first steel self-righting motorized lifeboat. Willemsoord-built lightvessel Texel (1952) is home to the museum of lighthouses and lightships. In 2004 the replica of the Dutch East India Company ship Prins Willem became part of the theme park Cape Holland. It was located in a dock, where it could be visited, but burned down in 2009.

=== Other entertainment ===
There are about a dozen bars and restaurants at Willemsoord. There are also about a dozen other businesses varying from para-medical business to real estate agents and sport facilities. Just how much Willemsoord is now a part of Den Helder, is shown by the presence of the new movie theater, and the city's theater, which is now also located in Willemsoord.

=== The wet dock ===
The national yard, Dutch 'Rijkswerf' was constructed around a wet dock. The wet dock was dug out by hand from 1812 to 1823. The soil was used to elevate the surrounding grounds. In 1857 the north side of the wet dock was extended by another 30 meters. Nowadays the wet dock is 325 meters long and 135 m wide. Originally it was 8 m deep. The Sea Sluice connected the wet dock to the open sea. In 1972 it was replaced by a bigger lock. Several notable buildings surround the wet dock. It connects to the two dry docks.

=== Dry Dock I ===
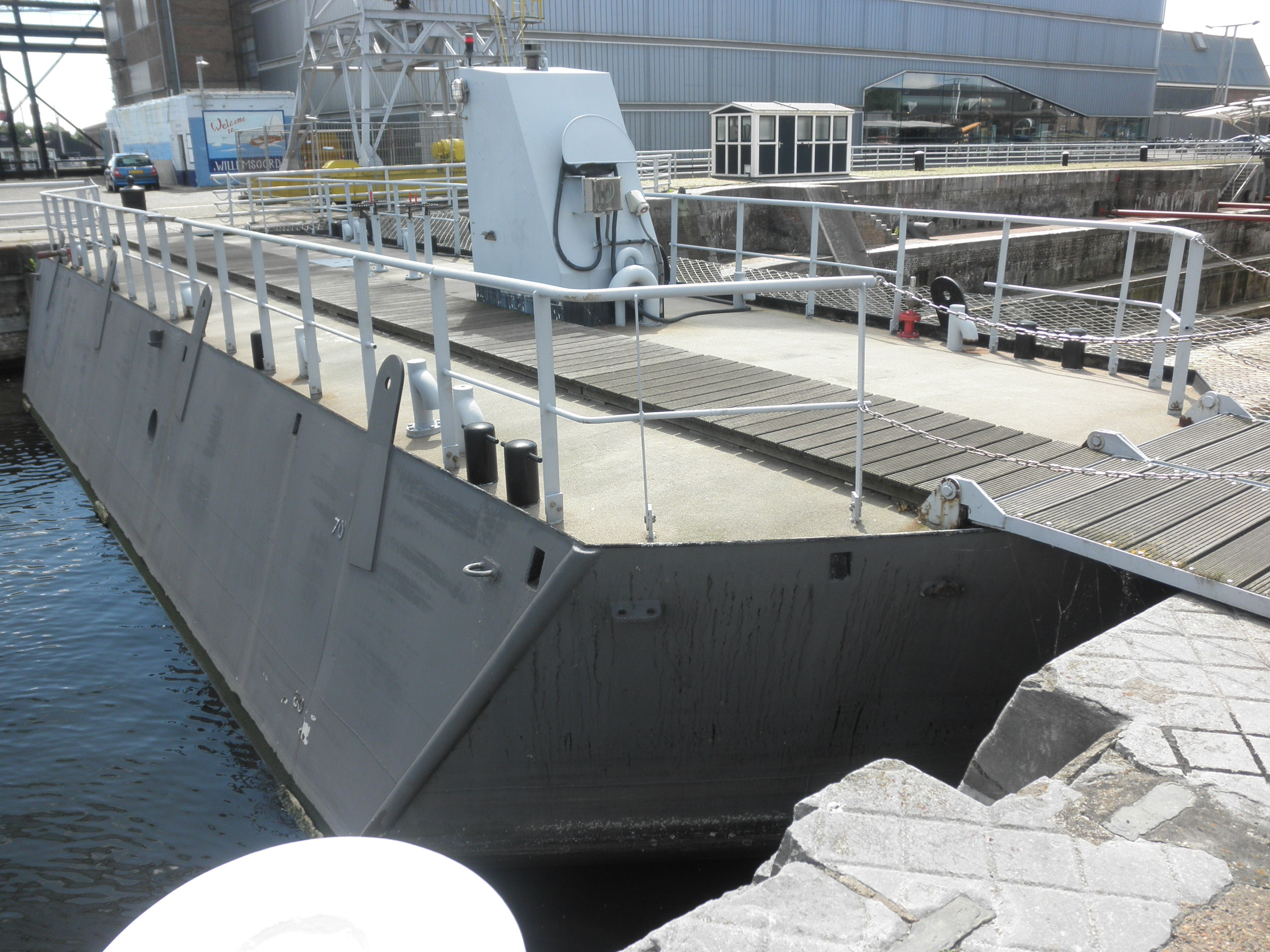
Floating door in Dry Dock I

Dry Dock I was designed by Jan Blanken. It was built from 1812 till 1822 and is near Steam Engine Building I, that was built to empty the dry dock. The dry dock is closed by a ship caisson. In 1822 the ship of the line Willem I of 74 guns was the first ship to use the drydock. From the start, the drydock faced problems with leakage. It nevertheless served to satisfaction, until it became useless in 1849. From 1850 till 1854 an attempt was made to repair the dock, but this failed completely.

In 1855 a commission then proposed to realize two dry-docks in Nieuwediep for about 1,000,000 guilders. In the budget for 1857 there was 25,000 guilders for making a dam and pumping the water out of the dry dock. During 1857 old masonry of the floor was broken out, and the foundations of the dry dock were investigated. In 1859-1860 a new dry dock was built on the foundations of dry dock I, and with use of the old outer walls. It was about 1 m shallower, and was less wide, but it had a longer keel block length.

Dry Dock I currently measures 85 by 25 meters on ground level, and is about 4 meters deep. The width of 25 meters applies to the top of the dock, and decreases incrementally till reaching the floor. Since 2005 it is home to the historic gunvessel HNLMS Bonaire, which is getting restored. This makes Dry Dock I one of the primary tourist attractions of Willemsoord.

=== Pumphouse I (Building 47) ===
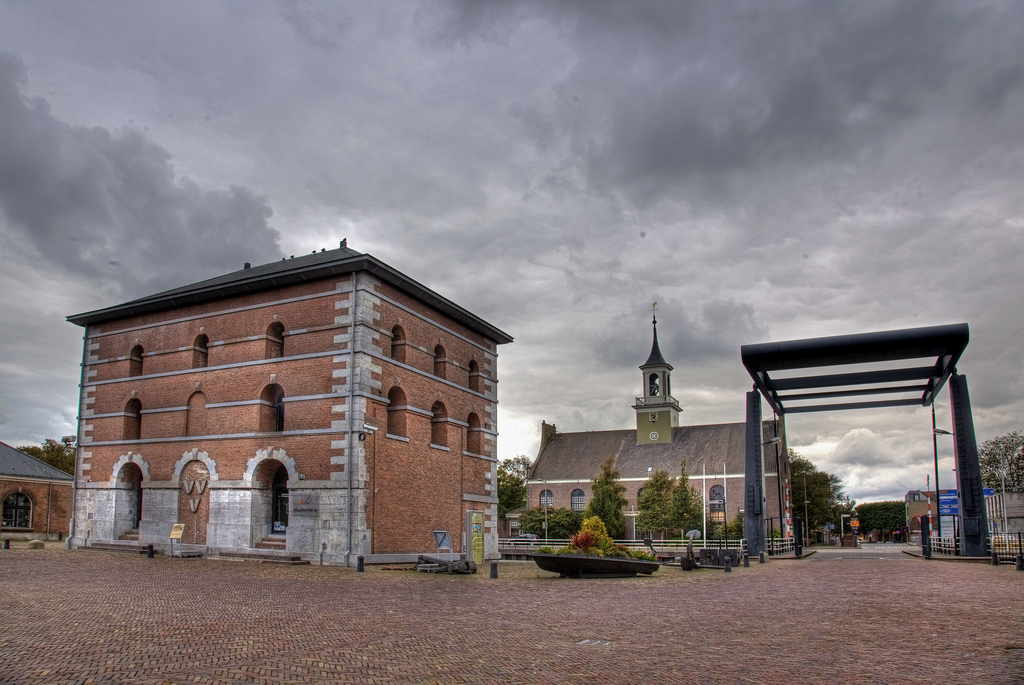
Stoommachinegebouw

Pumphouse I, also known as steam engine building I (stoommachinegebouw) is one of the oldest buildings of Rijkswerf Willemsoord, as it was required to construct Dry Dock I. It was built by Jan Blanken between 1813 and 1823 in neo-classical style. The building's main function was to house a steam engine which would drive 9 cylindrical pumps to quickly empty Dry Dock I at each docking. A subterraneous sewer connected the building to the dry dock, and allowed the pumphouse to drain the water to the canal that surrounds Willemsoord.

In 1862 the building became superfluous because of the construction of a new steam engine building for Dry Dock II, which would serve both drydocks. The building was converted to store ironware, and wheat for the naval bakery on the upper levels. In 1889 the lower levels were also converted to wheat stores. It earned it the name 'graanpakhuis', meaning 'wheat storagehouse'. Before and during world war II the building was strengthened with reinforced concrete. In 1942 the roof was also replaced by one of reinforced concrete. In 2004 the building was restored and designated to house the Tourist Office.

=== Dry Dock II ===
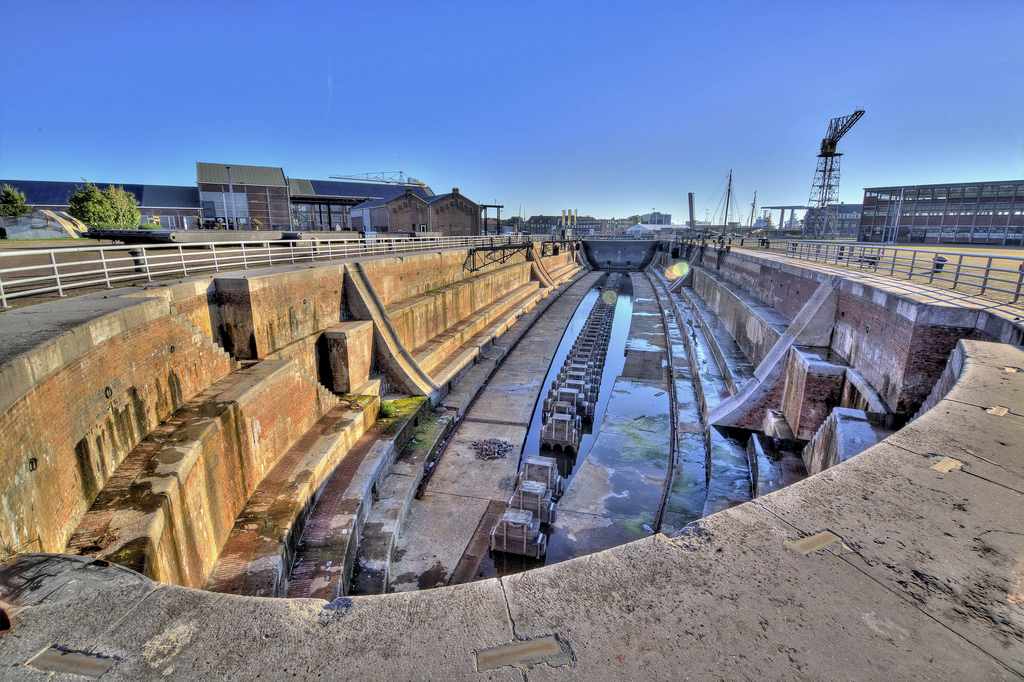
Dry Dock II, photograph in the direction of the floating door

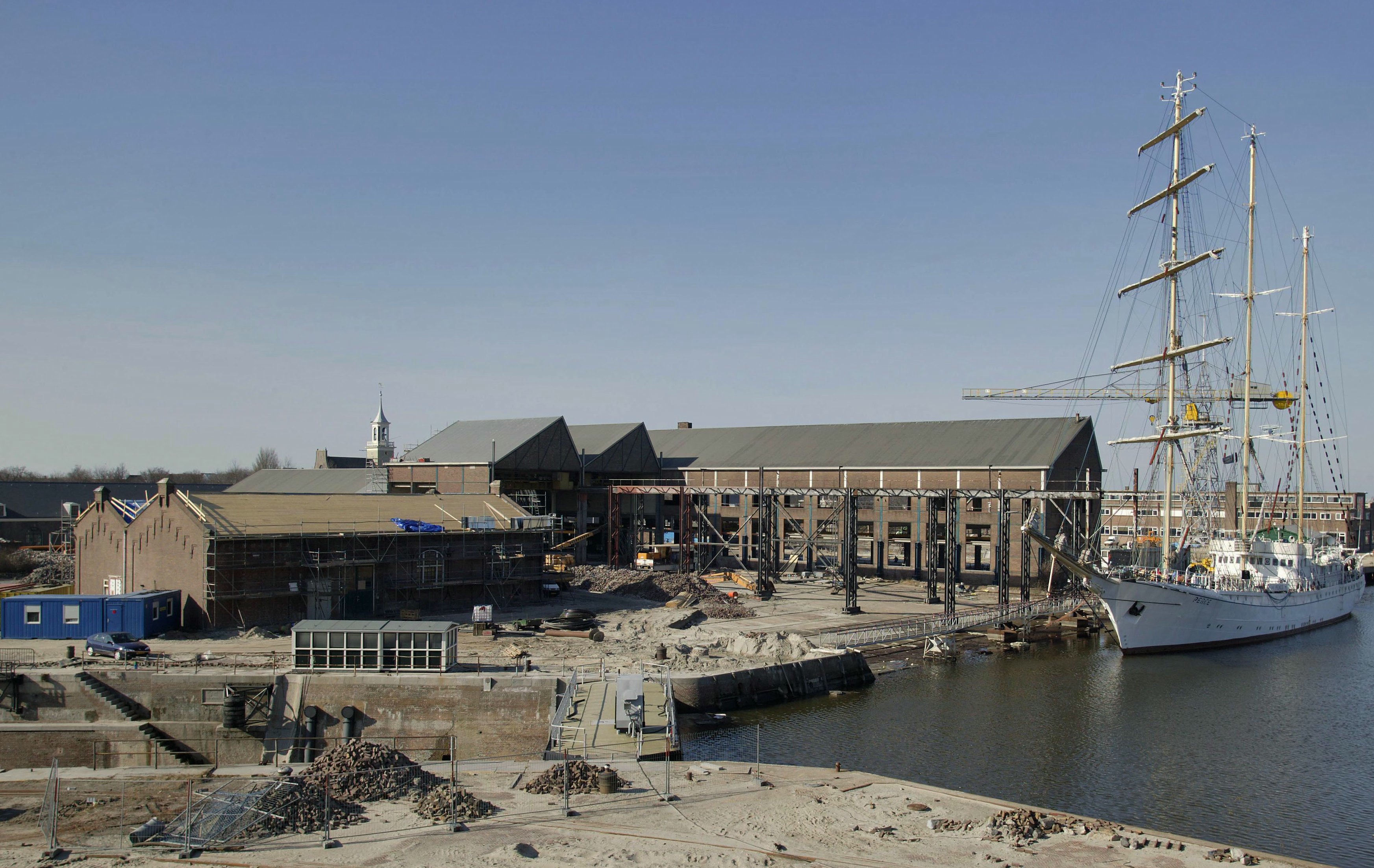
On the left Pumphouse II

The idea to create a new (and therefore) second dry dock in Willemsoord came about by the bad condition of Dry Dock I, and the fact that the dry docks in Hellevoetsluis and Vlissingen were too small for the new big ships. In April 1856 the minister for the navy Abraham Johannes de Smit van den Broecke proposed a budget law to raise the naval budget by 200,000 guilders in order to start the realization of dry dock II. This bill was defeated, because the house of representatives thought that a floating dock would be cheaper, nevertheless the minister stayed on by request of the king. De Smit van de Broecke's successor Johannes Servaas Lotsy had more political acumen and did succeed in acquiring the necessary funding. Dry Dock II, also known as the new dry dock, was built from 1857 to 1866. Just like Dry Dock I it was closed by a floating door, that has since been replaced.

Construction of Dry Dock II was troublesome. In August 1860 it unexpectedly filled with water, causing much damage to the masonry. Delivery was then delayed till July 1862. In September, only a few months later, disaster struck. The bottom of the dry dock was pushed up, and many rifts opened, flooding the dock. It took four years to strengthen the construction and to repair the damage. In 1866 Dry Dock II was finally ready. On 28 May 1866 the screw frigate Evertsen was the first ship to use the new dock. On 27 May 1867 Adolf van Nassau entered Dry Dock II in Willemsoord with all her guns on board, proving that it could handle the heaviest Dutch ships.

In 1966 the floor of Dry Dock II was replaced by one made of reinforced concrete. Dry Dock II is 120 meters long by 25 meters wide. The depth of the dock is 8 meters.

=== Pumphouse II (Building 56) ===
The pumps for Dry Dock II were driven by steam engines housed in a new pumphouse, later known as 'Gebouw 56' (Building 56), or simply Het Pomphuis. It was completed about 1859 and was intended to serve both drydocks. As the rebuild of Dry Dock I was finished before the completion of Dry Dock II, it actually started its career by serving only Dry Dock I.

The double use was not successful. The huge brick tubes that ran to both dry docks were soon destroyed by movement in the ground. Later new pumps for Dry Dock I were placed elsewhere, and replaced, by a Diesel and still later, electro engines. Pumphouse II had a basement for the pumps, a coal storage, and of course a chimney. In 1908 the building became a power plant.

=== Masthouse (Building 66) ===
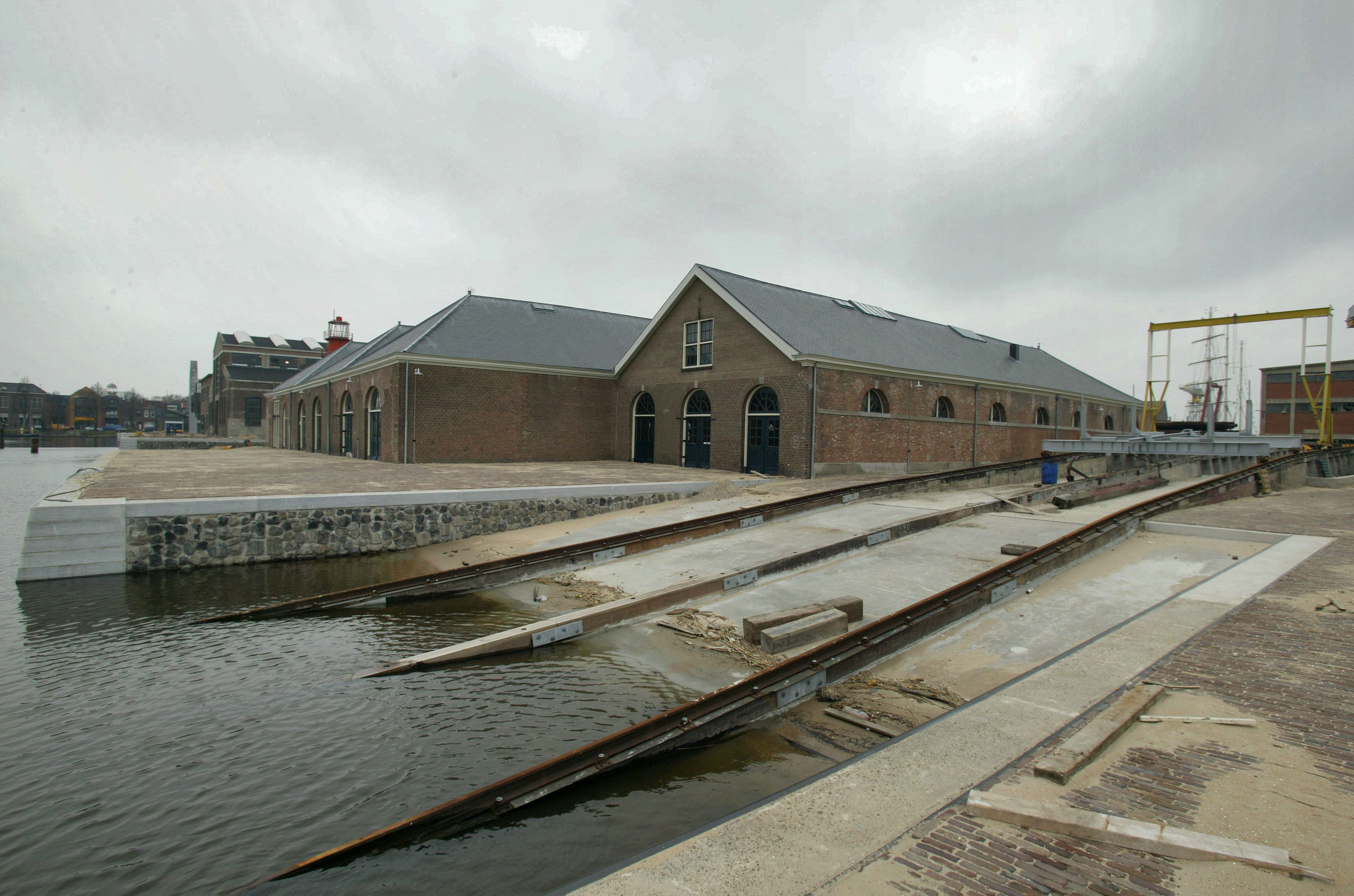
The Masthouse

The masthouse (mastenloods) was originally used to construct and store masts. It was the first building to be restored after Willemsoord ceased to be a navy base. The masthouse belongs to the oldest group of buildings on the site. It shows the typical neo-classical style of the time, and still has its original roofing. One of the four aisles has been shortened in about 1911. Inside many workers wrote their name with chalk on the beams of the roof. In 1915 the masthouse became a warehouse for iron parts. It got a Jugendstil office for the workplace commander and time writer. During World War II a 15 m long section of the building was destroyed. In 1997 the masthouse became a national monument.

From 1866 till 1878 a slipway nicknamed sluisdeurenhelling was constructed east of the building. The name translates as: 'slipway for shiplock doors'. Nearby there were multiple slopes to bring wood in and out of the water (houthelling).

After renovation it proved problematic to find tenants for the masthouse. Current (2021) situation is that the municipality of Den Helder will take it into use as town hall together with building 72.

=== Tarpaulin and ropemakers hall and (Building 72) ===
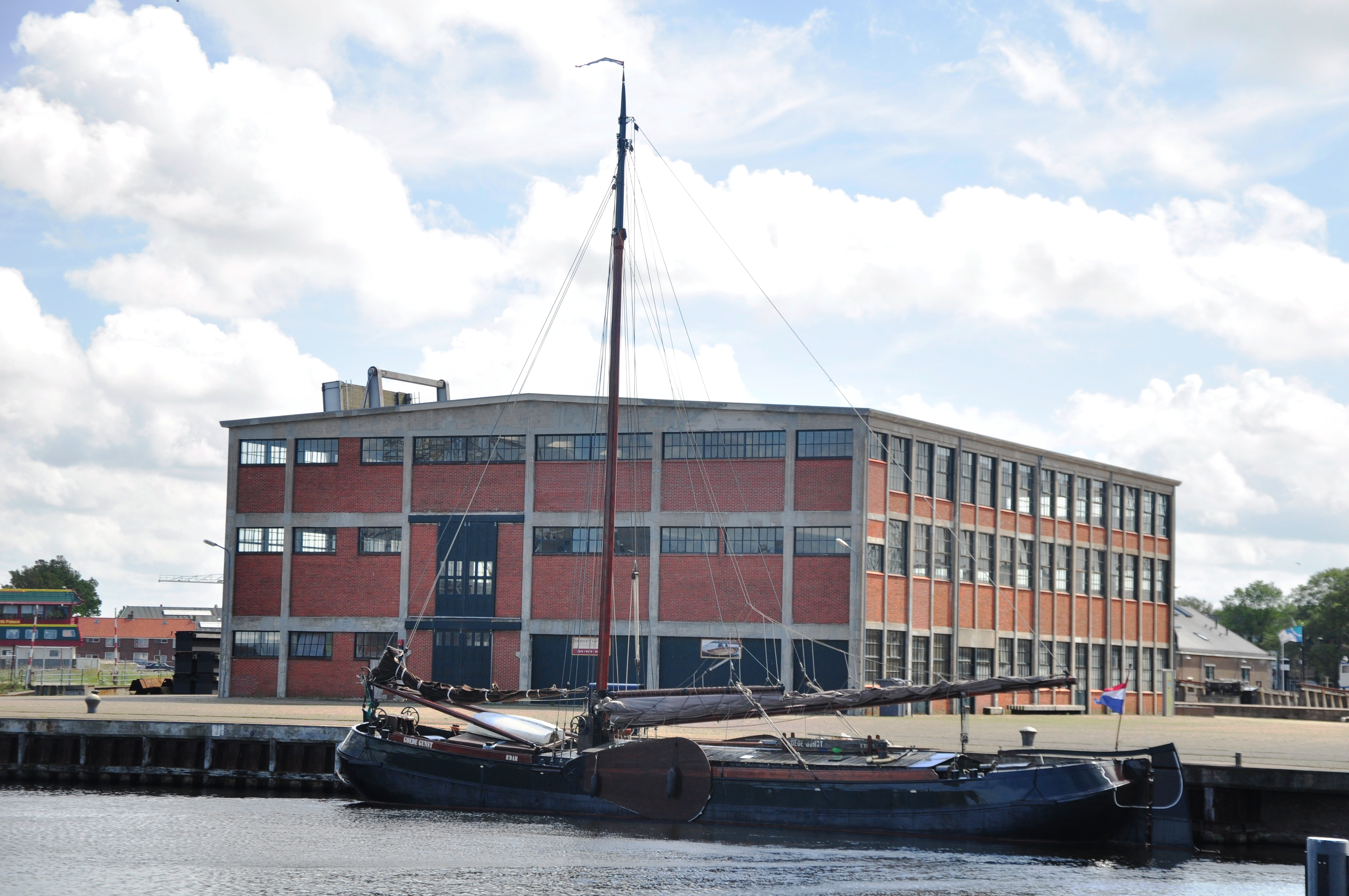
Building 72 in 2011

This building was ordered in 1948, and the design shows it. The building is of a reinforced concrete frame construction. The floors are also of reinforced concrete, while the frames are filled with brick. The whole is 40.40 by 30.5 m and 12.80 m high. It rests on 177 concrete piles.

In Dutch the building is called Zeilmakerij en takelaarswerkplaats met Magazijn. This suggests that the Dutch navy constructed a building for making sails and rigging post World War II. However, the Dutch word 'zeil' also refers to tarpaulin, and 'takelaar' usually meant somebody who makes ropes. The ground floor held an office and heating. The ropemakers were on the first floor together with leather working facilities and storage. The top floor held the tarpaulin shop and more storage.

Building 72 is to become part of the new town hall of Den Helder. It is not a monument, but has some protection as part of the cityscape. The plan is to use it as a working place for employees of the municipality. In order to make it more comfortable its appearance would change considerably, it will e.g. get more windows.
