= Medusa-class corvette =

Netherlands class of warship

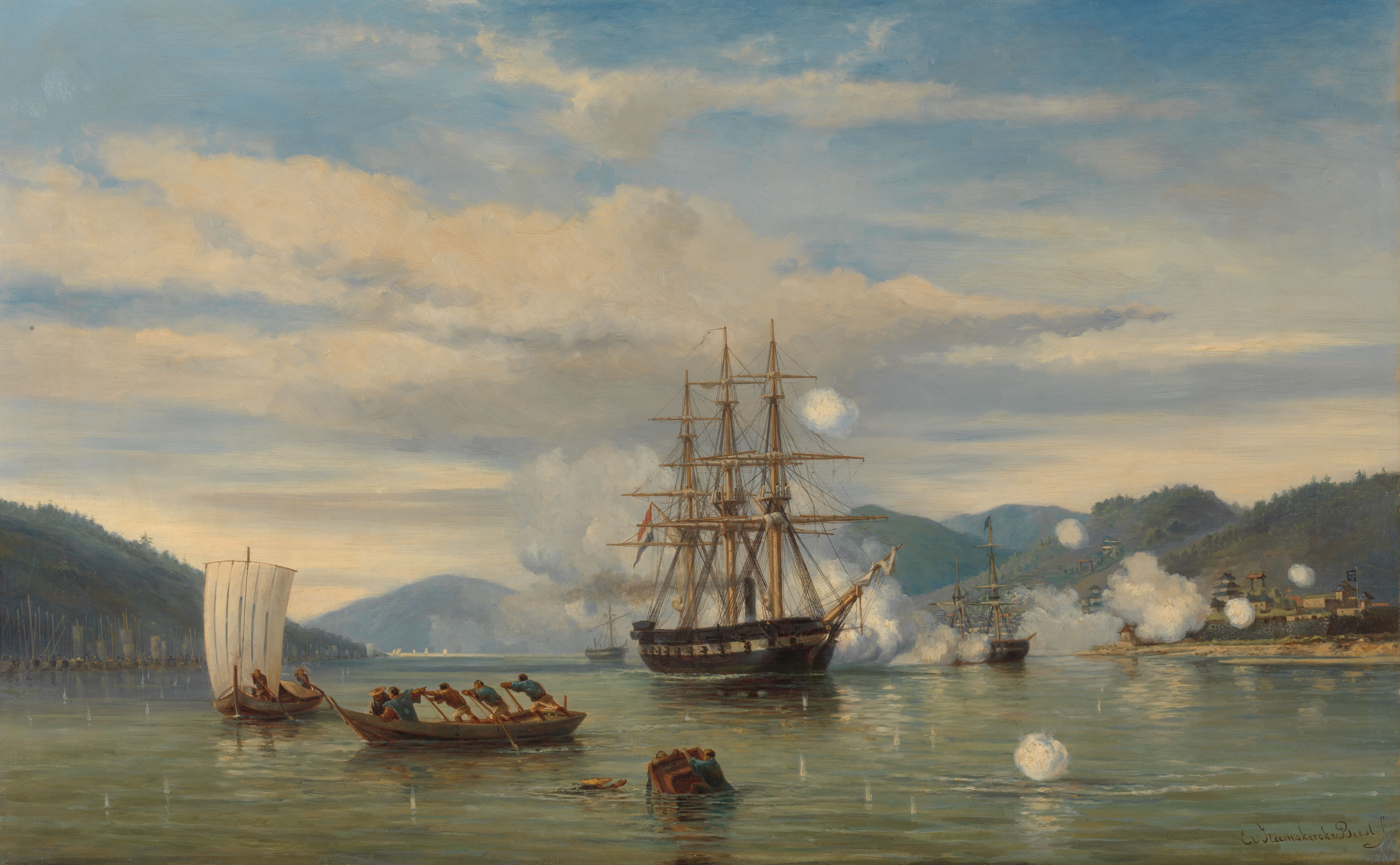
- 'Medusa in the Straits of Shimonoseki September 1864

Class overview
- Name: Medusa class
- Builders: Rijkswerf Amsterdam, Rijkswerf Vlissingen
- Operators: Royal Netherlands Navy
- Succeeded by: Groningen class
- In commission: 1855–?
- Planned: 2
- Completed: 2
- Scrapped: 2

General characteristics
- Type: Steam corvette
- Displacement: 1,241-1,512 tons
- Length: 51.52–49.8 m (169 ft 0 in – 163 ft 5 in)
- Beam: 11.14–11.6 m (36 ft 7 in – 38 ft 1 in)
- Draught: 5.00–5.40 m (16 ft 5 in – 17 ft 9 in)
- Installed power: 150 nominal horsepower
- Speed: steam: 6 knots (11 km/h; 6.9 mph); sail: 11 knots (20 km/h; 13 mph)
- Complement: 120
- Armament: 19 guns
- Armour: ship made of wood

The Medusa class was a class of two steam corvettes with auxiliary power of the Royal Netherlands Navy. The class comprised Medusa, the first Dutch warship with screw propulsion, and Prinses Amelia.

== Dutch naval plans in the 1850s ==
=== Dutch reaction to the Screw Steamship ===
In the late 1840s the English and French navies commissioned several screw frigates. The first of these were steam frigates with auxiliary power, meaning that they had only a small engine. The small engine kept other aspects of the sailing frigate; the sails, armament and its robustness, almost intact. Steam paddle frigates were still a bit faster under steam, but this was only true if there was no wind, or a head wind. With a moderate wind on a different course, the steam vessel with auxiliary power was faster. With less steam power, but a full sail plan it outran the paddle steam vessel. Therefore the comparatively cheap steam frigate with auxiliary power was superior to the paddle steam vessel in every respect.

The Dutch reaction was slow. Only in early 1852 a commission of naval officers was appointed to look into the possibilities of auxiliary steam power. Its advice was to build three screw steam ships with auxiliary power. Two in Amsterdam and one in Flushing. In early November 1852 the plans had been expanded to build three ships in Amsterdam and one in Flushing. There would be one screw frigate (Piet Hein, later Wassenaar), two screw corvettes named Medusa and Borneo (later Amelia), and one screw schooner (Vuurpijl, later Montrado)

== Characteristics of the Medusa class ==
=== Classification ===
There was a conspicuous aspect of the classification of the Medusa class. All Dutch paddle steamers had been classified as 'steamships' (Dutch: Stoomschip), 'steam vessels' (Dutch: stoomvaartuig) or even 'steam boat' (Dutch: stoomboot). To the contrary the Medusa's were called by their sailing equivalent 'corvette', or corvette with auxiliary steam power. A more specific label was 'kuilkorvet', meaning a corvette with a covered gundeck.

=== Dimensions ===
Medusa had a length of about 51 metres (167 ft 4 in), a beam of about 11 m (36 ft 1 in) and displaced 1,241 tons. The previous sail corvette Sumatra of 1848, was 40 m (131 ft 3 in) long, had a 12 m (39 ft 4 in) beam and displaced 943 tons. In general the corvette with auxiliary steam power still closely resembled the sailing corvette. In detail, it was about a quarter bigger because its length was increased to mount the steam engine and to store coal.

=== Propulsion ===
The machines for Medusa were made by Fijenoord shipyard in Rotterdam, then often referred to as NSBM. On trials Medusa achieved 7.75 knots (14.35 km/h; 8.92 mph), meaning that the maximum speed in service would be about 6.5 knots (12.0 km/h; 7.5 mph). On a somewhat rough sea it was only 6 knots (11 km/h; 6.9 mph).

The machines for Amelia were made by Van Vlissingen en Dudok van Heel in Amsterdam., later known as Werkspoor.

=== Armament ===
From the start the Medusas were planned to mount heavy artillery. At the time this was referred to as guns firing 60 and 30 pound shells. There is a note that the initial armament of Medusa had to be lightened after sailing trials ended badly.

In 1853 the Medusas were ordered to have on the battery deck: 4 grenade guns of 20 cm No 2 and 12 long 30 pounders No 3. On the upper deck there were to be 3 long 30 pounders No 3 One of them on a pivot on front, and two of them on the sides aft. The armament as given in 1865 was 12 * 30-pounder, 4 * 60-pounder, 1 * 12 pounder and two 12 cm mortars. On board were also a 12 pound howitzer and a 3-pound bronze gun, both for landing purposes, and 100 rifles. In 1869 the armament was reported as: 8 long 30-pounders, 4 20 cm grenade guns and 4 rifled 16 cm guns.

The 60-pounders were so impressive for a corvette that one might be tempted to think that they were replaced when the battery was lightened. This was not the case, because at the time the grenade guns were officially designated 'by the weight of the solid shot they fired'. For the 20 cm Grenade gun No 2 this meant that it was designated as a grenade gun of 60-pound. Indeed the 20 cm grenade gun No 2 had a caliber of 20.14 cm, exactly the same as that of the 60 pounder gun. The media of 1852 and de Casembroot therefore designated the 20 cm grenade gun No 2 by mentioning the weight of the solid shot it fired, i.e. 60 pounds, instead of using the novel designation by the bore of 20 cm. To sum it up: the cannon firing 60 pound bullets is the grenade gun 20 cm No 2. The mounting of a 'lighter battery' then consists of removing the 30-pounder guns from the upper deck.

== Construction ==
Of the two ships Medusa was built at the Rijkswerf in Amsterdam and Prinses Amelia at the Rijkswerf in Flushing.

=== Amelia or Amalia? ===
Prinses Amelia was often called Amalia. Amalia was (and is) a name common in the Dutch royal family. However, at the time, and especially in official communications, the ship was called Prinses Amelia. This has to do with the ship being named for Princess Amalia of Saxe-Weimar-Eisenach. 'Amelia' seems a strange mix of the Dutch Amalia and the French equivalent Amélie.

Name	Laid down	Launched	Commissioned	Fate
Medusa	25 November 1852	22 June 1854	10 April 1855	
Prinses Amelia (ex-Borneo)	5 August 1853	12 October 1855	1 June 1856	10 September 1875 decommissioned
