= Bromo-class sloop =

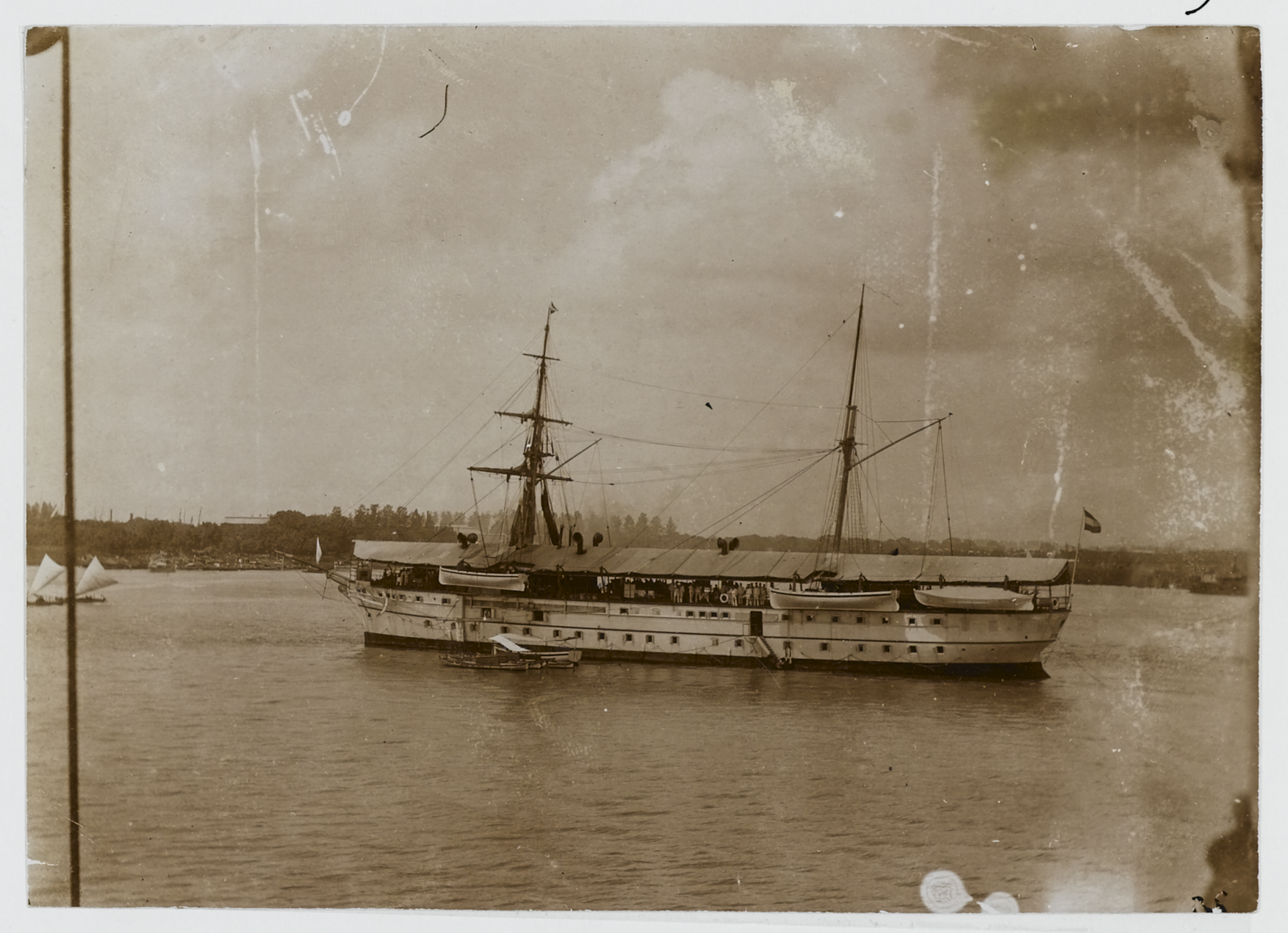
- Bromo as guard ship in Surabaya after 1892

Class overview
- Name: Bromo class
- Builders: Van Vlissingen en Dudok van Heel, Fijenoord
- Operators: Royal Netherlands Navy
- Preceded by: Sumatra class
- Built: 1873 - 1875
- In service: 1875 - 1917

General characteristics
- Type: Paddle steamer
- Displacement: 1,524-1,556 t
- Length: 60.00 m (196 ft 10 in)
- Beam: 9.39 m (30 ft 10 in)(excluding paddles)
- Draught: 4.00 m (13 ft 1 in)
- Installed power: 200 nominal horsepower 813 ihp (606 kW)
- Complement: 134
- Armament: 2 × RML 16 cm No. 1; 4 × 12 cm A No. 1

The Bromo class were a class of large paddle-steamers (sloops) of the Royal Netherlands Navy in the Dutch East Indies. The class comprised Bromo (1874) and Merapi (1874).

== Context ==
In the 19th century Dutch East Indies, the navy was primarily used to project internal authority over the archipelago. There were campaigns against local rulers, the flag had to be shown at distant stations, and there was piracy. For these tasks, there was no need for warships with a massive broadside. It made the paddle steamer an immediate success in the Indies. The previous wooden Bromo class, which arrived in the East Indies in 1844, was mentioned as a good model for a big paddle steamer for the Indies. The remark that the new steamer should be suitable to easily disembark troops said a lot about the intended use of the ships.

In the early 1850s the first three ships of the big Ardjoeno class arrived. Somewhat later, the almost equally sized screw propelled Medusa-class corvettes showed the end of the suitability of paddle steamers in a conflict with European enemies. The Dutch nevertheless continued to build many paddle steamers for the East Indies. These were probably more reliable in the local circumstances. During the 1862 parliamentary inquiry about the navy, multiple witnesses stated that a number of paddle steamers was necessary for the Indies. For example they were used as towboats, as vessels of shallow draught, and to transport troops.

The ship models mentioned as necessary in 1862 were about 1,000 t or smaller. In the late 1860s the four iron paddle steamers of the Sumatra class were built, these measured about 1,000 t. At the end of 1872 orders had been given for one Celebes-class paddle steamer of 640 t, and one even smaller Onrust-class paddle steamer of 370 t.

== Ordering and construction ==
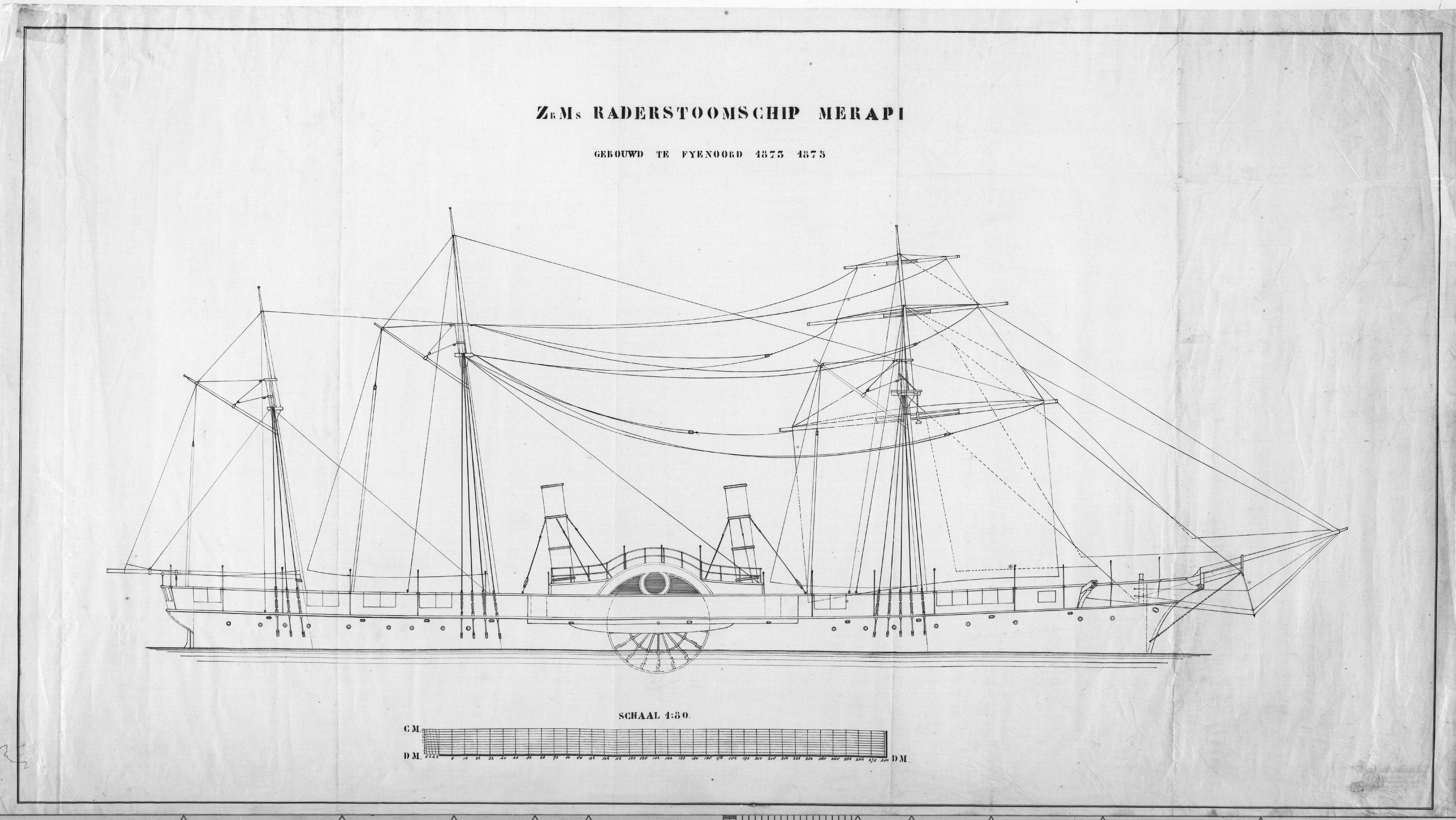
HNLMS Merapi in 1875

=== Ordering ===
By the end of 1872 there was also an order for an improved Sumatra-class paddle steamer code named Phoenix. In early 1873, the Aceh War started. It would lead to a big increase in naval spending.

In June 1873 a law to increase the navy budget was approved. The construction of a composite-built version of the Vesuvius-class sloop was cancelled in favor of one more 'improved Sumatra type' paddle steamer. This law also ordered four more composite-built gunvessels of the Pontianak class. During 1873, it became known that the two vessels of the 'improved Sumatra class' would be named Merapi and Bromo.

Given that the Bromo class was 50% bigger than the Sumatra class, one might be tempted to think that the navy used the Aceh War to order bigger ships. However, with regard to crew size, nominal engine power, and even armament, the Bromo's were not that different.

The start of the Aceh War also led to a decision by the Dutch government about the necessity of having paddle steamers in the Dutch East Indies. Required were six large or medium paddle steamers and four small paddle steamers.

=== Construction ===
Both ships were laid down in 1873 and launched in 1874. Bromo was built by Van Vlissingen en Dudok van Heel, Merapi by Fijenoord.

=== Naming ===
The class was named after two active volcanos on Java. Bromo after Mount Bromo, Merapi after Mount Merapi.

== Characteristics of the Bromo class ==
=== Design ===
As regards dimensions, the Bromo class was the biggest iron paddle steamer built up to date in the Netherlands. The class was about 50% larger than the preceding Sumatra class. They were seen as an improved Sumatra class, and one hoped that the improved machinery would reduce coal consumption and increase speed. The increase in speed necessitated the lengthening of the hull.

The hull was made of iron covered with wood (i.e. not composite). The outside was again covered in zinc. Bromo was noted to handle badly in rough weather. With high swell her speed was deemed unsatisfactory in relation to her coal consumption.

=== Armament ===
The armament of the Bromo's was also seen as an improvement over the Sumatra class. From the start, the Bromo class had only rifled muzzle loaders and (rifled) breechloader guns. On the other hand, the armament of the Sumatra class still included traditional 30-pounder smooth bore muzzle loaders when the Bromos entered service.

The main guns were two RML 16 cm No. 1. These were the steel version. The design drawings show these as placed on pivots and sledges on the stern behind the third mast and on the bow just before the first mast. There were also four smaller rifled breechloaders 12 cm A No. 1.

In 1890 the armament of the class was given as two 16 cm rifled breechloaders, four 12 cm A No. 1s, two 7.5 cm breechloaders, and two 3.7 cm guns.

=== Propulsion ===
The steam engines of the Bromo class were of 200 hp nominal. In 1886 the power of the engines was given as 1,012 ihp (755 kW) for Bromo, and 1,096 ihp (817 kW) for Merapi. At the same time that of the remaining Sumatra-class paddle steamers was given as about 600 ihp (450 kW). Later, the ihp of the Bromo class was given as 788 and 813 ihp (588 and 606 kW).

The hulls of Bromo and Merapi had the same dimensions: 60 m (196 ft 10 in) long with a beam of 9.39 m (30 ft 10 in). However, measured over the wheel boxes, Bromo had a beam of only 16.17 m (53 ft 1 in), while Merapi measured 16.80 m (55 ft 1 in).

The class had three masts with a barque sail plan. On her first trip to the Dutch East Indies, her commander noted that Bromo was of very little value as a sailing ship. However, her sails were used during the trip. The third mast of Bromo was removed when she became a guard ship in Surabaya.

== Ships in class ==
Bromo class construction data
Name	Built by	Laid down	Launched	Commissioned	Repurposed	Fate
Bromo (1874)	Van Vlissingen en Dudok van Heel	1873	22 September 1874	16 March 1875	1 April 1892 guard ship in Surabaya. Became a supply ship (Note: In Dutch the ship was classified as vivresschip.) for the army in 1905 and later between 1910 and 1917 it served as coal hulk.	Sold in 1917
Merapi (1874)	Fijenoord	20 August 1873	8 October 1874	16 March 1875		July 1896 unfit
