= RML 16 cm No. 1 =

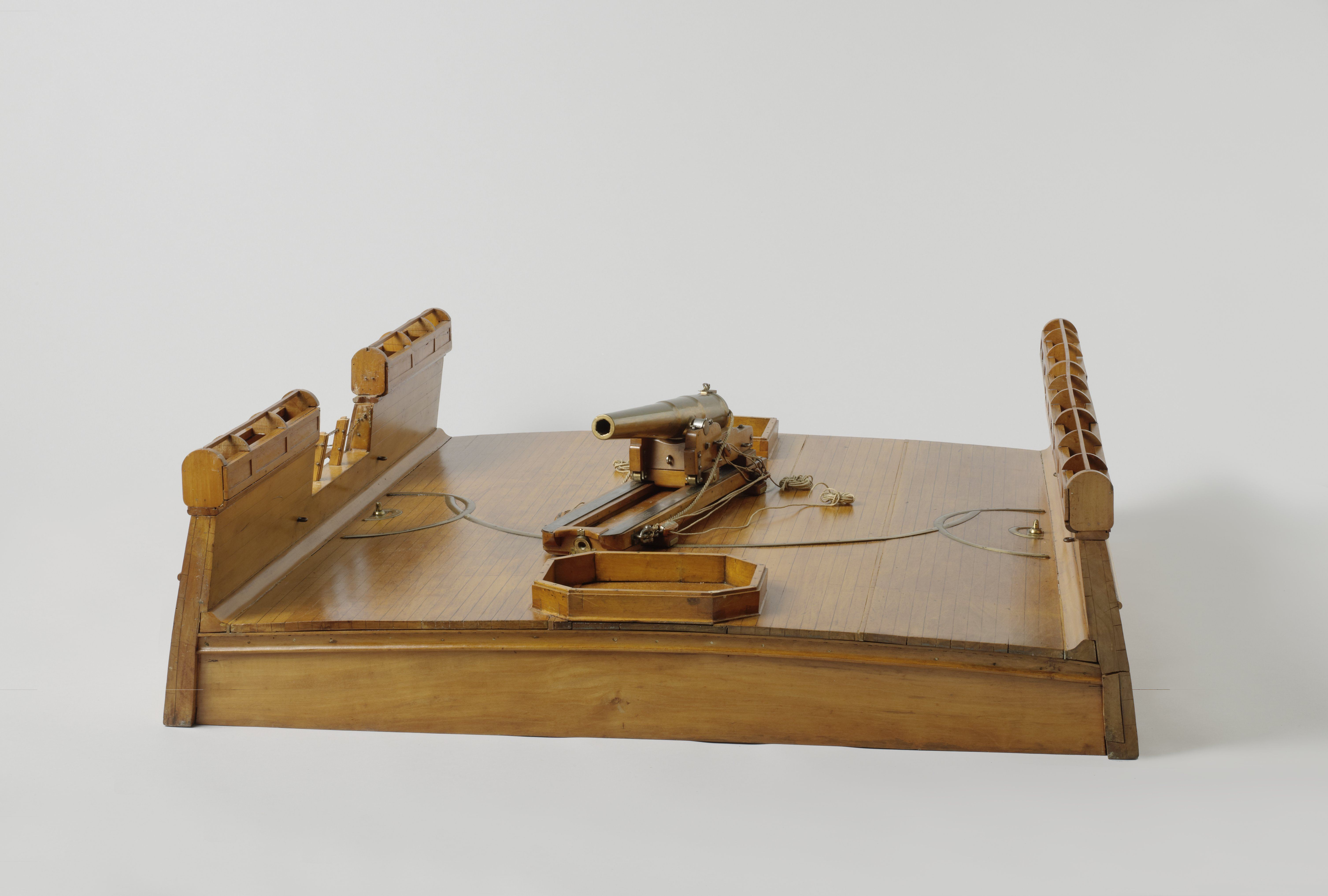
- Model of RML 16 cm No. 1 on pivot, as mounted on Watergeus
- Type: Naval gun
- Place of origin: Netherlands

Service history
- In service: 1863 - 1881
- Used by: Royal Netherlands Navy

Production history
- No. built: 46

Specifications
- Mass: 2,825 - 3,150 kg
- Length: 3.38 m
- Caliber: 16-centimetre (6.30 in)
- Muzzle velocity: 326.7 m at 43 m

The RML 16 cm No. 1, or Getrokken kanon van 16 cm No. 1 was a rifled muzzle loading gun. It was the first Dutch rifled gun which had been designed as such.

== Context ==
=== March 1862: Battle of Hampton Roads ===
In late 1861 the Dutch had started to produce the rifled 16 cm No. 3 gun by converting 38 old carronades. While this 16 cm rifled muzzle loader seemed to fit the future Dutch requirements for heavy navy ordnance in late 1861, this was no longer the case after the March 1862 Battle of Hampton Roads. This battle proved two things. On 8 March CSS Virginia proved that wooden ships did not stand a chance against armored ships. On 9 March the fight between Virginia and USS Monitor implied that, even at very short distances, the ultra-heavy smooth bore muzzle loader and most standard rifled muzzle loaders were almost completely ineffective against contemporary armor.

=== Subsequent Dutch naval policy ===
The battle led the Dutch to almost immediately stop the conversion of the sailing frigate De Ruyter to a steam frigate. Instead, most of her would be destroyed by converting her to a casemate ironclad like Virginia was. With regard to the Dutch East Indies, the Djambi-class corvettes now seemed obsolete as the mainstay of their defense. Instead the Dutch designed the somewhat smaller, but much sleeker, and therefore faster Watergeus-class sloops.

== Development of the RML 16 cm No. 1 ==
=== Development of the RML 16 cm No. 1 ===
In 1862 it was decided that instead of a traditional full battery, the Watergeus-class sloops would be armed with 5 long rifled 30-pounders. This was later changed to 6 guns: two long rifled guns on pivots on the center line, and four smaller rifled guns on the sides. De Fremery, Head of Artillery of the Navy, designed the long RML 16 cm No. 1 in March 1863.

By September 1863 a new model 16 cm 100-pounder, for placement on the upper deck of warships, was in the early stages of production. Production of this bronze version was done by J.J. Maritz in The Hague, which had also made the previous No. 3. Steel 16 cm No. 1's. At that time negotiations for a cast steel version were underway. The order would later be placed at Krupp in Essen, Germany.

By September 1864 three RML 16 cm No. 1's ('long 16 cm RML's') were ready, and 6 more were planned to be delivered later that year. In 1865 20 more were to be acquired. In January 1865 11 long 16 cm RML's were under construction.

=== Number produced ===
The Dutch government budget for 1876 had a rather complete overview of the armament of the fleet. It stated that there were 46 RML 16 cm No. 1 in stock, of which 7 on their way back from the Dutch East Indies. These 46 guns were valued at 315,000 guilders, or 6,848 guilders a piece. The number of 46 guns in stock might represent the total number produced, but this does not take into account possible loss or sales.

== Characteristics ==
=== Dimensions ===
With a length of 3.38 m the RML 16 cm No. 1 was longer than all preceding 16 cm / 30-pounder guns in service with the Dutch navy. This was a stark contrast with the extremely short RML 16 cm No. 3 of only 2.05 m long. No. 1's extreme length had a very practical consequence. The Djambi-class corvettes already had a problem with the somewhat shorter 30-pdr Long No. 4, which hindered the crew with its length of 3.19 m. For Watergeus, with a beam of 9.74 m instead of Djambi's 12.25 m, this would have applied even stronger. When not in a pivot mounting, the RML 16 cm No. 1 used the same carriage as the Long 30-pdr No. 4. However, in view of the gun's length, usage on a simple carriage seems unlikely except on the steam frigates.

The RML 16 cm No. 1 weighed 2,825 kg in the steel, and 3.150 kg in the bronze version. This is about equal, and interesting given that not many heavy guns had a steel and a bronze version. The No. 3 weighed about the same as the iron SBML 30-pdr No. 4, but far less than the long 60-pounders which had been introduced shortly before.

=== Number of grooves ===
The RML 16 cm No. 1 had 6 grooves, which started 20 cm from the bottom on the inside of the tube.

=== Ammunition ===
With regard to ammunition, it's not that clear whether the No. 1 and No.3 fired different projectiles, or the same. The solid shot for the RML 16 cm No. 1 consisted of cylindrical bullets (puntkogels). These were 41 cm long, of which 25 cm were cylindrical. The diameter was 15.93 cm, weight 47.5 kg. The solid shot had two rows of 6 lugs.

The grenade (puntgranaat) for the RML 16 cm No. 1 came in two varieties. The hardened grenade (glashard), was intended to be used against armored ships. The normal grenade was intended for use against wooden ships. These were 49 and 31 cm long, and weighed 49.5 and 24.4 kg. Each had 6 lugs in front, and 3 aft. Haakman's remark about the hardened grenade, that it was provided for No. 1. makes it probable that No. 3 did not have a hardened grenade.

=== Effectiveness ===
On 9 August 1865 trials were held with the RML 16 cm No. 1 firing 3 shots at an armor plate mock up. With the regular powder charge of 6.5 kg two hardened shot, and one phosphor grenade penetrated the armor plate at 200 yards

In December 1865 new trials were held with the RML 16 cm No. 1. The primary objective was to investigate whether the hardened shot that weighed 52 kg (100-pounder) could penetrate armor at 1,200-1,300 m. In order to do this, the speed at that distance was calculated, and then the powder charge was decreased to give the projectile that speed at 200 yards. This time the armor plate concerned was a copy of the armor on board HNLMS Prins Hendrik der Nederlanden, then under construction. None of the projectiles fired penetrated this armor plate. The conclusion was that at normal ranges, Dutch coastal defense artillery would be ineffective against armored ships as long as it did not switch to a caliber higher than 16 cm.

The next day, trials continued. With a powder charge of 9 kg, the RML 16 cm No. 1 then succeeded in penetrating the armor plate at 200 yards with hardened and regular iron shot. The armor plate proved better than that used in previous trials. The high powder charge was so heavy, that due to the length of the barrel, the speed of the projectile could not be further increased. This again stressed the necessity to increase the caliber of the rifled guns.

In May 1877 trials were held on board the artillery school ship Het Loo, moored in the Nieuwediep. Nine shots were fired from the bronze RML 16 cm No. 1 with the grenade of 25.8 kg and a powder charge of 3 kg. The average speed of the grenade was 326.7 m at 43 m from the muzzle.

A few years after its introduction, the RML 16 cm No. 1 was mentioned in an overview of contemporary recent developments of Dutch naval artillery. It was said that when the heavy SBML 60-pounder was introduced, it was a very powerful gun. In 1862 the 16 cm No. 3 was probably better, but the rule of the 60-pounder SBML was clearly broken by the 16 cm No. 1. Again a few years later, the armoring of ships had so far progressed, that even the 16 cm No. 1 was powerless against armored ships.

== Usage ==
=== On ships ===
The sloop Watergeus was the first to get the 16 cm No. 1. Two pieces were placed on pivots on the center line of the ship. The model of the gun depicts this placement.

In January 1865 11 long 16 cm RML's were under construction for Adolf van Nassau. Another long 16 cm RML would be mounted on Cycloop.

On 1 October 1885 the two Bromo class paddle steamers launched in 1874 each had two 16 cm No. 1's probably from the start. The somewhat smaller paddle steamers Borneo and Banka, launched in 1867 also had two 16 cm No. 1's each. The paddle steamers Soembing, Sindoro, Oenarang and Salak each had 1 16 cm No. 1. The two remaining Riouw-class gunvessels vessels each had one 16 cm No. 1, but the other gunvessels had been provided with the RML 7-inch Armstrong Gun.

The Japanese frigate Kaiyō Maru was built in the Netherlands, and launched on 3 November 1865. She was still in the Netherlands in October 1866. Shortly before, she had been armed with Krupp rifled muzzle loaders in Hellevoetsluis or Brouwershaven. Therefore, she might have had the RML 16 cm No. 1.
