= Hector-class gunvessel =

Class of vessels of the Royal Netherlands Navy

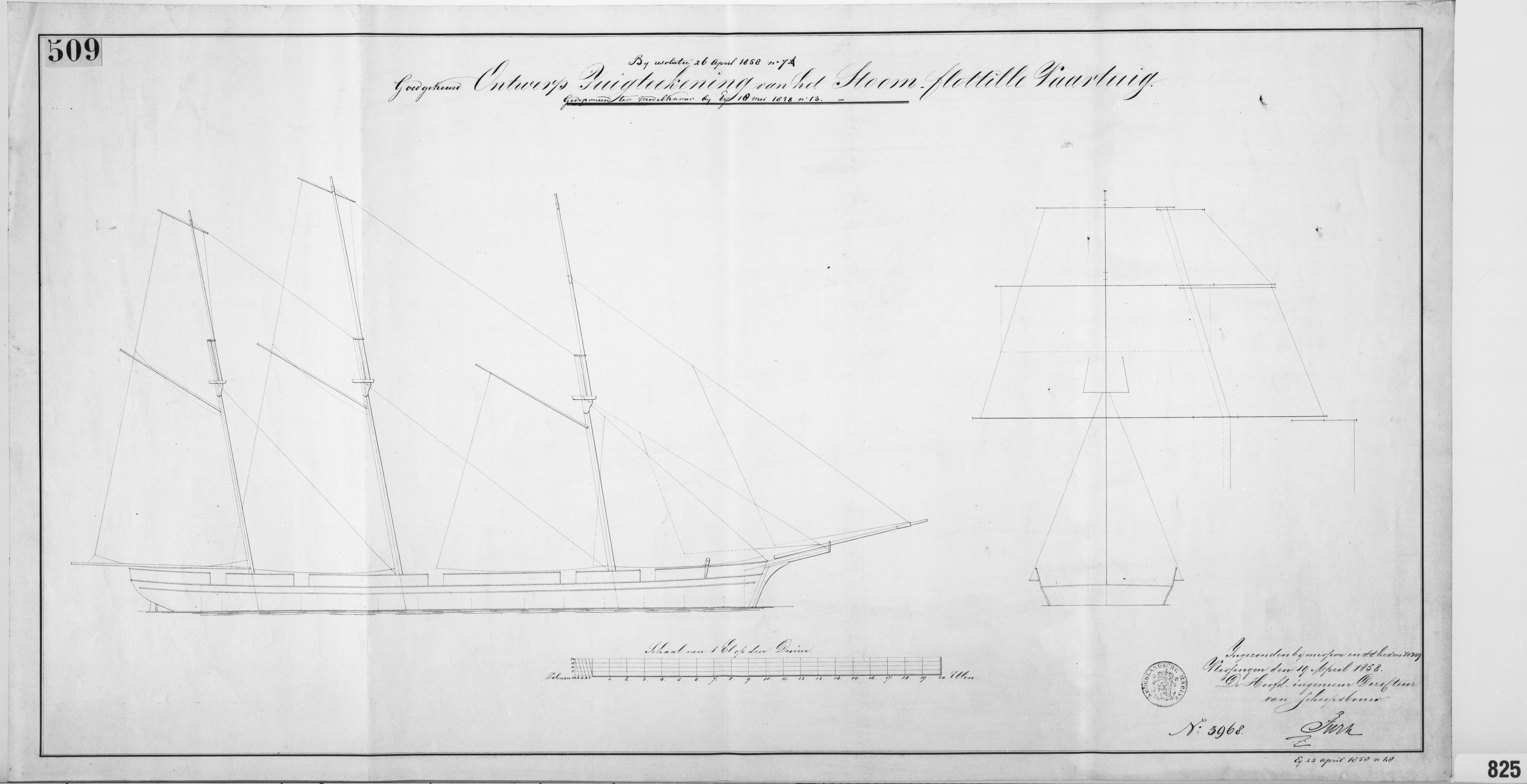
- Design for Hector 26 April 1858

Class overview
- Name: Hector class
- Builders: Rijkswerf (Amsterdam)
- Operators: Royal Netherlands Navy
- Succeeded by: Haarlemmermeer class
- Completed: 2
- Scrapped: 2

General characteristics
- Type: Gunvessel
- Tonnage: 230
- Displacement: 383 tons
- Length: 34.60 m (113 ft 6 in)
- Beam: 7.40 m (24 ft 3 in)
- Draught: 3.20 m (10 ft 6 in)
- Installed power: 60 nominal hp; ? indicated horsepower
- Complement: ?; 54 as barracks ship

The Hector class was a class of 2 gunvessels of the Royal Netherlands Navy. The class proved a failure.

== Context ==
=== High demand for gunboats and gunvessels ===
In 1855 the Dutch navy designed the sail-only Pro Patria class gunboats, in Dutch: 'Verdedigingsvaartuigen'. The class was 20 m (66 ft) long, had a draught of less than 2 m (6 ft 7 in), two masts and mounted four 30-pounder cannon and a mortar. At least 13 of these gunboats were built. For river and coastal defense these would have to be supplemented with steam gunvessels, in Dutch: stoomflottille vaartuigen. Meanwhile, a lot schooners, schoonerbrigs and small paddle steamers in the Dutch East Indies were expected to become unfit in a few years.

=== Dual purpose gunvessels ===
When the United Kingdom sent some gunvessels to China, the Dutch got an idea to solve the high demand for steam gunvessels. A high pressure steam engine took less space than a low pressure one. Using a high-pressure steam engine would allow construction of a small screw gunvessel. For service in the Indies the ships would have to be loaded with many supplies, and have a deep draught. For service in home waters they would not have to be loaded so heavily, and would therefore have a shallower draught required for coastal and river defense. The ships would furthermore have to mount a heavy battery, and have to be good sailers. By October 1857 the plans were in progress.

== Characteristics ==
=== General ===
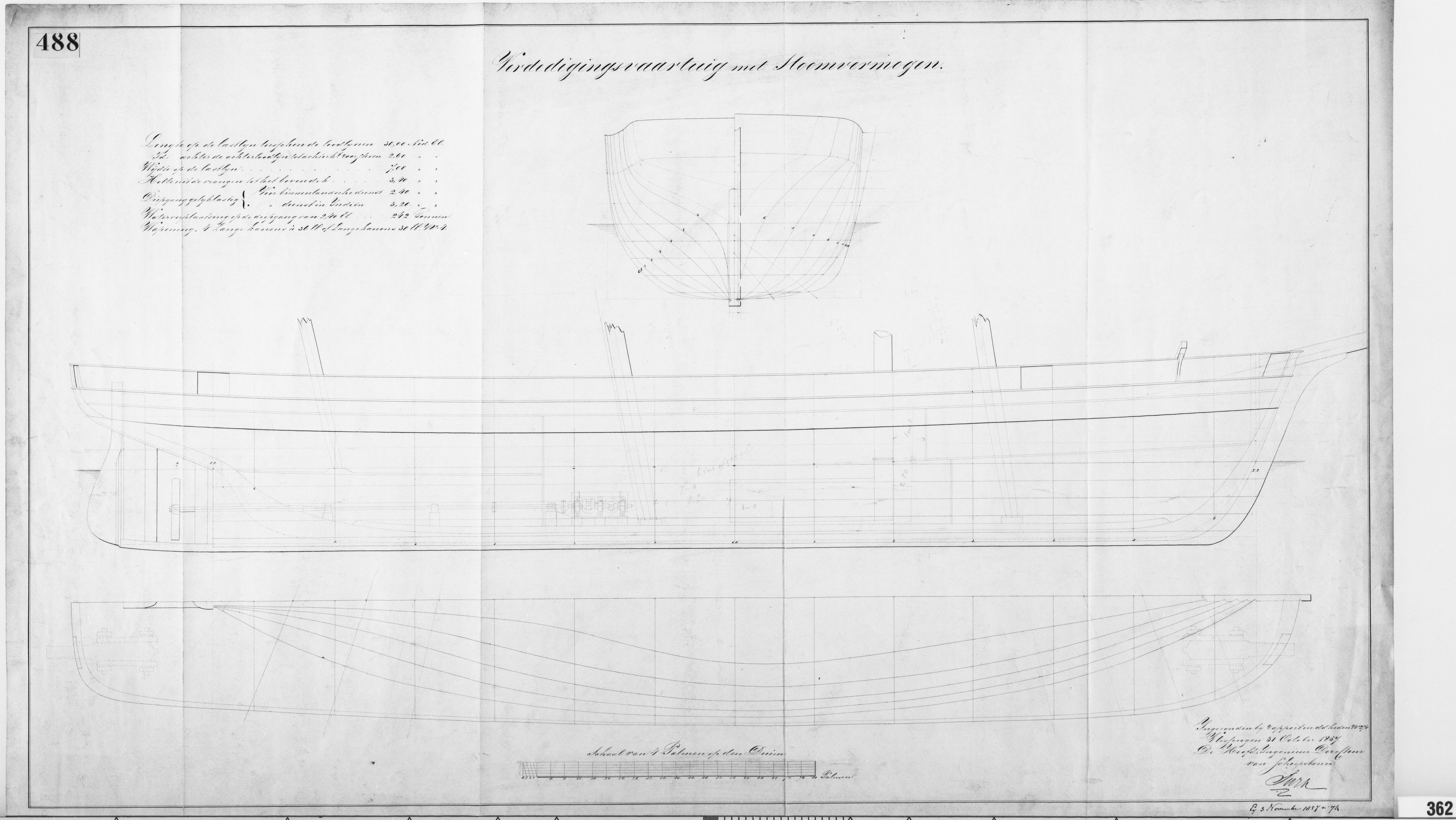
1857 early design for Hector

A design drawing of the Hector class dated October 1857 called for a vessel of three masts, 30 m (98 ft) long, and with a draft of 2.4 m (7 ft 10 in) in home service and 3.2 m (10 ft) in the Indies. The armament would consist of four 36-pounders or four 30-pounders long No 4. This drawing is titled 'Verdedigingsvaartuig met Stoomvermogen' and was (is) stored together with the drawings of the Pro Patria class. This design or a slightly different one of these dimension was approved on 27 February 1858.

Shortly after the approval of 27 February 1858 the navy decided to lengthen the ship by resolution of 26 April 1858. In the new drawings the Hector got the title 'Stoom-flottille vaartuig'.

=== Propulsion ===
An essential feature of the Hector design was the use of high-pressure steam engines. These took much less space than low-pressure engines. The designers therefore thought it feasible to build ships with the same battery as the Vesuvius-class sloops, but with less draught, and much smaller. The objective was a vessel armed like the Vesuvius, but costing far less. The design proved a failure even before the first of the Hector class was commissioned. In East Asia the English gun vessels with high pressure were in continuous repair, and so the Dutch did not send the Hector class to the East Indies.

=== Armament ===
In 1861 the armament of the Hector and Vulkaan was given as 8 guns. In view of the statement that the class was to carry the same battery as the Vesuvius class, this could have been four medium 30-pdr SBML and four 12-pdr SBML. In 1869 the armament was given as only 4 long 30-pounders.

=== Criticism ===
The Hector and Vulkaan drew a lot of criticism in the 1862 investigation of the navy by the Dutch house of representatives. Captain-lieutenant J. Andrea called the Hector and Vulkaan: 'failed, even though they might be put to some use.' K.L. Turk, chief engineer of naval construction, said: 'Only the Hector and Vulkaan are less suitable, because too many demands had been made.' Captain-lieutenant J.A.H. Schreuder said: 'the flotilla vessels are failures for their purpose, and of no use. They have too much rigging, are too tight, and draw too much water for coastal defense'. Captain-lieutenant R.L. de Haes considered the small vessels that had been built recently to be 'a failed experiment'.

After the Hector class the Dutch navy hastily returned to using low-pressure steam engines in ships meant for the East Indies. The Haarlemmermeer class that followed would prove that the high pressure engine was not the only flaw in the Hector design.

== Ships in the class ==
=== Construction ===
Name	Laid down	Launched	Commissioned	Fate	Built by
Hector	1 May 1858	22 June 1859	16 April 1860		Rijkswerf Amsterdam
Vulkaan	1 May 1858	20 May 1859	1 May 1865	Sold 3 January 1912	Rijkswerf Amsterdam
