= Haarlemmermeer-class gunvessel =

Former class of 9 gunvessels of the Royal Netherlands Navy

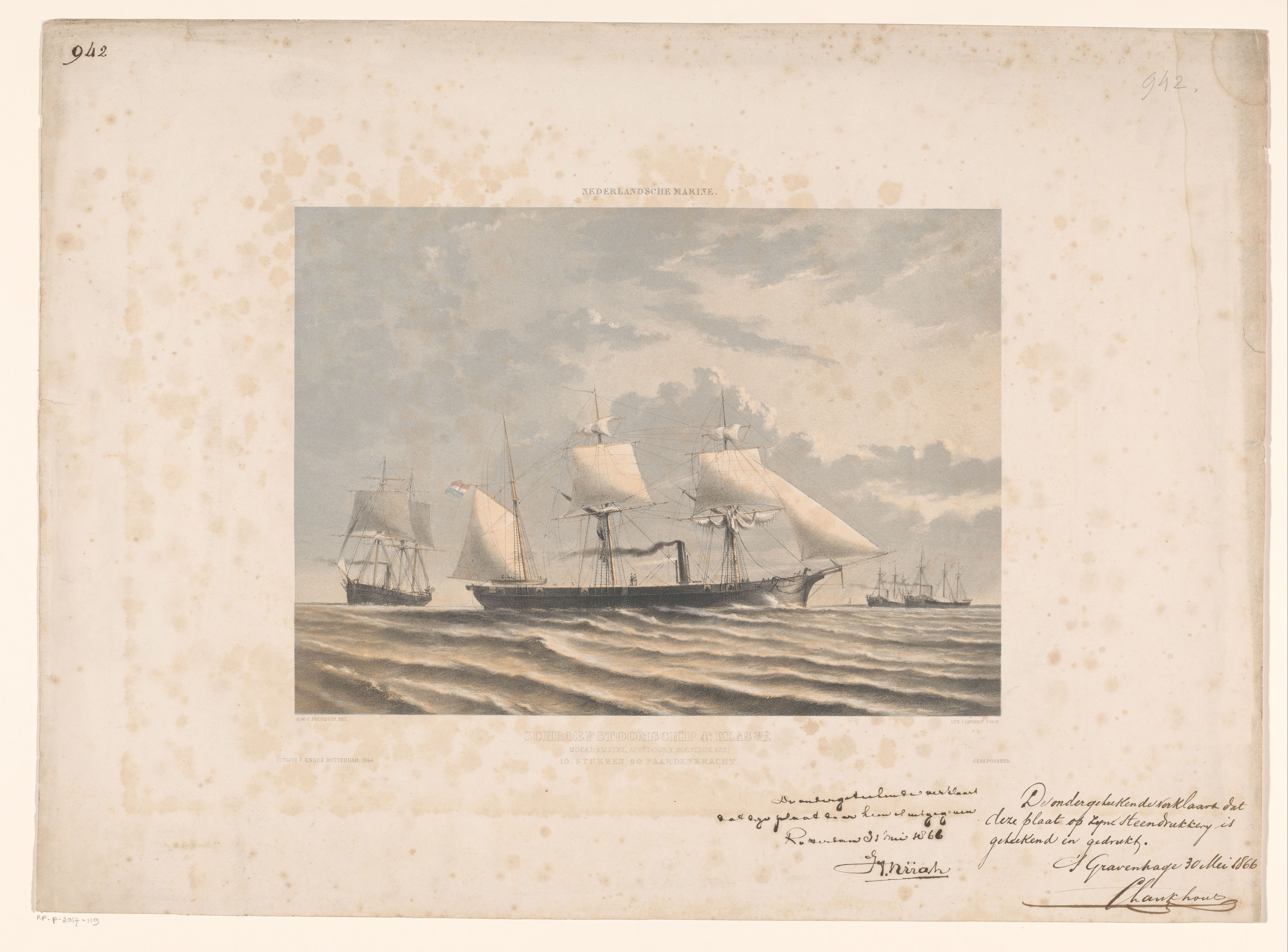
- Schroefstoomschip 4e klasse model Amstel, Apeldoorn, Soestdijk enz.

Class overview
- Name: Haarlemmermeer class
- Builders: multiple
- Operators: Royal Netherlands Navy
- Preceded by: Hector class
- Succeeded by: Soestdijk class
- Planned: 11
- Completed: 9
- Scrapped: 9

General characteristics
- Type: Gunvessel
- Tonnage: 285
- Displacement: 586 tons
- Length: 40.70 m (133 ft 6 in)
- Beam: 8.16 m (26 ft 9 in)
- Draught: 3.20 m (10 ft 6 in)
- Installed power: 80 nominal hp; 204 indicated hp
- Speed: 6-7 kn
- Complement: 75
- Armament: 2* 30-pdr medium gun; 2* 30-pdr carronade

The Haarlemmermeer class was a class of nine gunvessels of the Royal Netherlands Navy. The class was a failure because of its extreme susceptibility to dry rot.

== Context ==
=== High demand for gunboats and gunvessels ===
In comparison to other small navies the Dutch navy had to guard and control an enormous area. This is obvious with regard to the Dutch East Indies, but it also applied to the Netherlands themselves. Most major cities bordered the sea or major navigable rivers, and so did many smaller places. It was clear that the Dutch army and the regular warships of the Dutch navy could not deter enemy gunboats from entering the many rivers or the Zuiderzee and the Zeeland deltas. Therefore, the Dutch required a disproportionately large number of shallow draught vessels for the defense of their cities. A somewhat later table applying to armored vessels showed this. The Dutch naval budget equaled that of Austria, and superseded that of Turkey and Spain, but these three states each deployed 5-9 battleships, while the Netherlands had none.

=== Dual-purpose gunvessels ===
The Dutch navy tried to make the demand for many small vessels more bearable by designing a vessel that could be used in the Netherlands as well as in the Dutch East Indies. With such a ship the number of ships in ordinary could be reduced significantly. The Hector class gunvessels seemed to offer the solution. For service in the Indies the ships would have to be loaded with many supplies, and have a deep draught. For service in home waters they would not have to be loaded so heavily, and would therefore have the shallower draught required for coastal defense. A relatively small high pressure steam engine would allow these plans to be realized on a ship much smaller and cheaper than the Vesuvius class.

=== Redesign of the Hectors ===
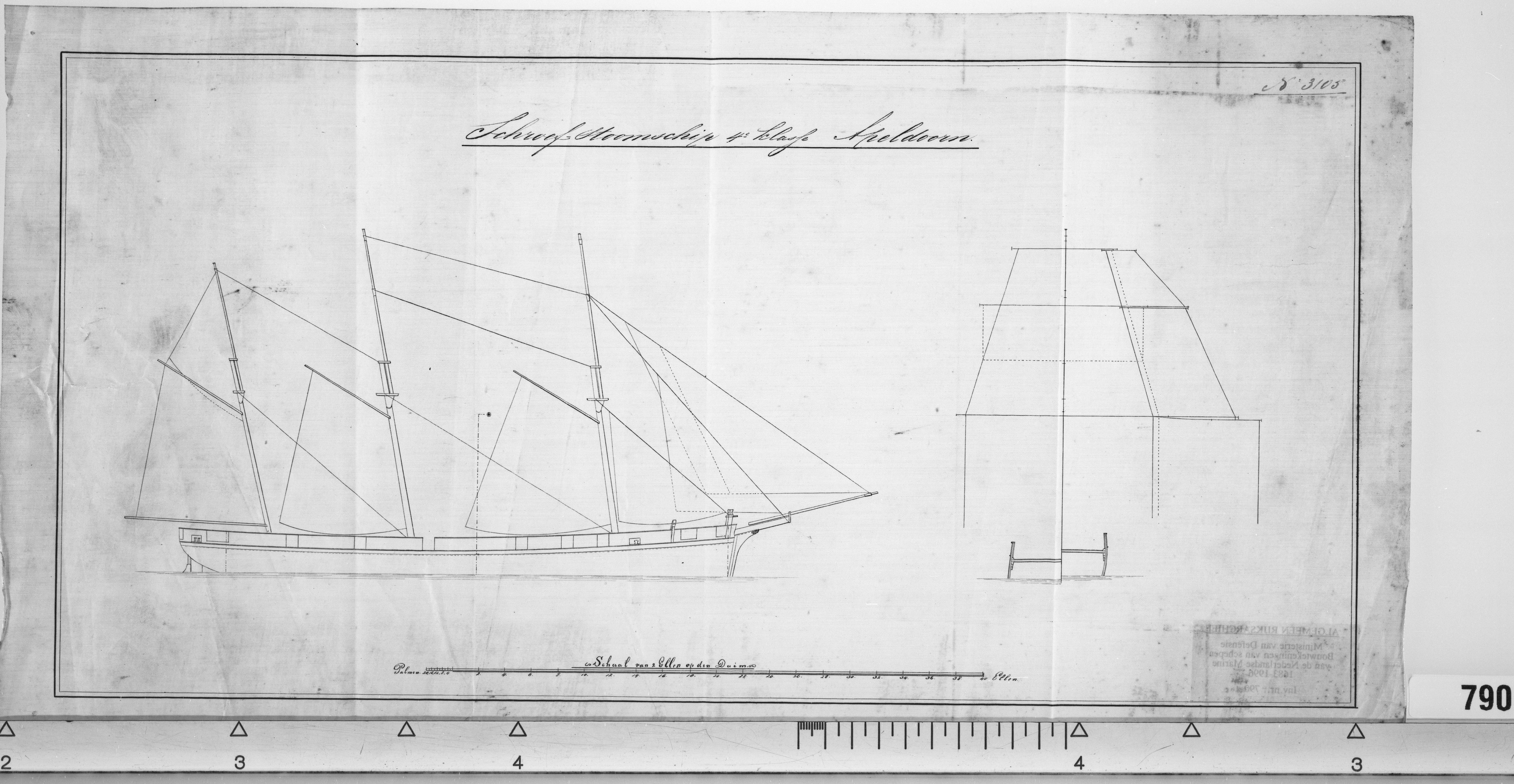
Gunvessel Apeldoorn of the Haarlemmermeer class

The vessels of the Hector class were launched in May and June 1859. Somewhere before October 1859 the Dutch navy got the news that high pressure steam engines were not suitable for the far east. One can assume that this was even before they were launched, because no mention was found about a change of plans after the succeeding Haarlemmermeer class was ordered.

=== Ordering ===
The Haarlemmermeer class was ordered by a tender. It meant that the department of the navy published plans, and shipyards could offer to realize these at a certain price. On 27 July 1859 45 offers for the tender for 10 ships without the machines had been received. Each lot consisted of two ships. For lot 1 D. Borkes from Gouda offered lowest at 202,494 guilders. For lot 2 G.H. Uitenboogaard from Maassluis for 207,885. For lot 3 A. van der Hoog from Amsterdam for 179,675. For lot 4 again G.H. Uitenboogaard from Maassluis for 203,885 and as a second C. Boelen from Ridderkerk for 208,188. For lot 5 K. Katers from Groningen for 200,164. Because Uitenboogaard wanted only one lot, C Boelen seemed to take his place in lot 4. In the end the order for lot 4 was still awarded to Uitenboogaard and lot 2 was not awarded. Later on it became known that the second lot was not awarded because the prices were higher than expected.

Shipyard Koning William on the Hoogte Kadijk in Amsterdam was awarded the contract for the Amstel and the Apeldoorn. Its owner A. van der Hoog had contracted for these for 179,675 guilders. On 15 September Arie van der Hoog ceded the name A. van der Hoog and Compagnie to Nicolaas van der Werff merchant captain from Dokkum. Nicolaas van der Werff would continue the company A. van der Hoog with its shipyards Koning William on the Hoogte Kadijk and the Parel on the Wittenburgergracht. Van der Hoog had offered more than 10% below the competition. Furthermore, wages in Amsterdam were on average much higher than in places like Maassluis, Groningen and Gouda. It is therefore probable that Van der Hoog took the job at a loss. Shipyard Koning William continued in operation until it announced closure in March 2018.

== Characteristics ==
=== General ===
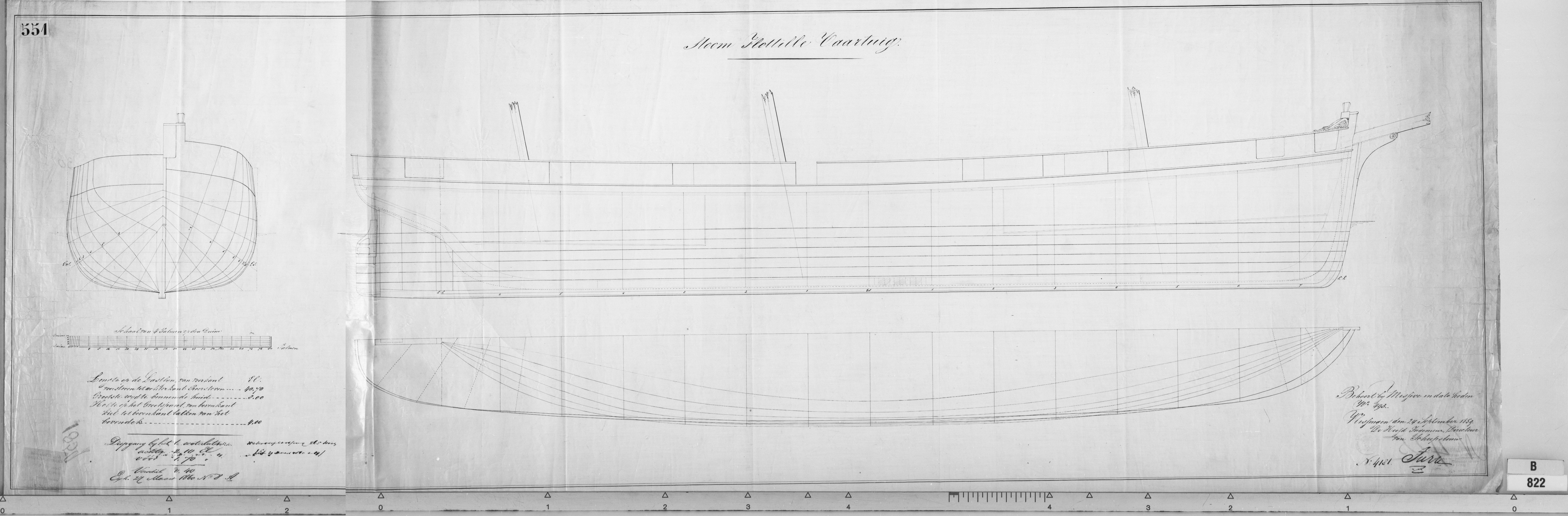
1859 drawing of Haarlemmermeer with dimensions

The preceding Hector had been a vessel of 34.60 m by 7.40 m with a draught of 3.20 m. After the news that high-pressure engines could not be used in the East Indies came in, the naval department set about to design a new dual purpose gunvessel that used a low pressure steam engine. At 40.70 m by 8.16 m and with an equal draught, the Haarlemmermeer displaced 586 tons. In comparison to the 383 ton displacement of the Hector this was an over 50% increase in size.

=== Propulsion ===
The Haarlemmermeer class used an 80 hp low pressure steam engine that was to give the class a speed of 8 knots by steam only. Eight of these engines were ordered at Van Vlissingen en Dudok van Heel and Fijenoord. An attempt to order the ninth engine at another factory was not successful.

The requirement to be able to cross the oceans meant that the class had the heavy sails and rigging required to do so. In effect this made the ships clumsy when operating near shore, or on rivers.

=== Armament ===
In 1861 the armament of the class was given as 10 guns, i.e. two more than on the Hector class. In 1869 it was given as two medium 30-pounder cannon and four 30-pounder carronades. In that same year the Hector class mounted for long 30-pounder cannon. Therefore, it seems that the class had a lighter armament than the Hector class.

In 1869 the Vesuvius class had two 16 cm Rifled Muzzle Loaders and four medium 30-pounders. It meant that the original idea to build a small type of ship (Hector, Haarlemmermeer) that would rival the bigger Vesuvius class in armament had not been realized.

== Criticism ==
=== Design failure ===
The Haarlemmermeer class drew a lot of criticism in the 1862 investigation of the navy by the Dutch house of representatives. Captain-lieutenant A.R. Blommendaal thought the Haarlemmermeer a vessel for so many goals that it missed all. Captain-lieutenant J.A.H. Schreuder probably referred to both the Hector class and the Haarlemmermeer class when he stated that "the flotilla vessels are failures for their purpose, and of no use. They have too much rigging, are too tight, and draw too much water for coastal defense." Lieutenant 1st class P. van Lelyveldt stated: "The flotilla vessels are bad sea ships. They are too small, not suitable for service in the colonies, and lack proper lodgings for the crew." By giving a very positive comment about the class Captain-lieutenant J. Andrea was an exception. He stated that for certain purposes he thought the Haarlemmermeer class the best type of ship to send to the East Indies. He also stated that he thought them very useful there because they could sail up the many rivers, the Haarlemmermeer having sailed 80 miles up the Siak River on Sumatra.

The summary of the 1862 investigation accidentally mentions the worst consequence of the design failure that the Haarlemmermeer class would later prove to be. Due to the attempt to combine too much functions on a small surface, the heat of the engines could not properly escape the ship. It points to insufficient ventilation, a major cause of dry rot.

By constructing the screw steamships 4th class, also designated as steam flotilla vessels, the designers tried to satisfy three demands. One wanted the vessels to be able to assist in the national defense by serving on our rivers, to be able to cross the ocean, and to serve in the East Indies. The consequence, in the opinion of almost all, is that these ships are not satisfactory in any respect. They have too much draught, are hindered by too heavy sails and rigging, and do not have enough space to lodge the crew. The lodgings of the crew are way too hot, and in the Indies the heat is almost unbearable. There were reports of the temperatures in the engine room reaching 150-180 degrees Fahrenheit (65-82 degrees Celsius) and of stokers fainting on the job. Misplaced economy seems to have had the usual consequences in this respect.

=== Susceptibility to dry rot ===
The 1862 investigation of the navy was held when the class had been in the water for only 1–2 years. At that moment the most serious problem of the class was not yet known. By 1866 five of the nine ships in the class were no longer in service, all of them unfit after only a few years in the Dutch East Indies. A sixth ship, the Stavoren followed in 1868. That year she became a hydrographic vessel after less than four years of regular service in the Dutch East Indies. A seventh ship, the Dommel was probably already rotten in 1867, after service in the West Indies. Only two ships seemed an exception: The Amstel would become an old ship, even after serving a few years in the West Indies. The Haarlemmermeer would see extensive service in the East Indies, it was still short, but she survived significantly longer than the others.

The problem that brought these ships to an early end was dry rot, now called brown rot, a fungus that causes wood to decay. If found in oak wood the Dutch called it 'Vuur' and contaminated wood 'vervuurd'. In 1865 accidental repairs found the Apeldoorn to be so contaminated by dry rot that she could not be repaired. The Linge was sold on account of dry rot in 1867. The same was true for the Dommel in 1871. In general all steam vessels generated heat on the inside of the ship, and were therefore more susceptible to dry rot than sailing ships, especially in the tropics. At the time it was well known that seasoning the wood before use and ventilation of the ship were the only effective means to prevent dry rot. As stated above, the design of the Haarlemmermeer did not allow sufficient ventilation.

The other known cause of dry rot was using unseasoned wood. Wood could be seasoned by storing it for some time before use, or by lengthening the construction time of ships, causing the wood to season while the ship was on the slipway. Already in 1860 the minister of the navy was warned that the class had been built too quickly. During the discussion about the law for the 1861 navy budget on 8 December 1860, the famous liberal M.P. Pieter Blussé van Oud-Alblas, a major shipping line owner from Dordrecht, made the following remarks:

I read on the bottom of page 2: Especially for steamships, which are exposed to varying degrees of temperatures, dampness and drought, and of which the timber is exposed to dry rot far more than that of sailing ships, it is important not to hasten construction more than necessary. They are to remain on the slipway for some time in order to prevent untimely decay. In order to do this without delaying construction more than necessary, one had to utilize all available slipways. On the slipway the frame of the ship would first be built. Later the ship would be rounded off and finished... Then at the bottom of page 3 I read: The advantage gained by leaving these (small) ships on the slipway for some time, while using the amount of wood only suitable for small vessels, prompted a decision to slowly built three more steam flotilla vessels at the Rijkswerf in Amsterdam, and two at the Rijkswerf Vlissingen.

(Blussé van Oud-Alblas summarizes): If this is useful for ships built at a Rijkswerf, it is also useful for ships built at a commercial shipyard. In the plans (for the ships built at commercial shipyards) this principle has been neglected, because these plans all order a very speedy delivery of these ships, so they cannot spend much time on the slipway. Therefore it's likely that these ships will speedily get affected by dry rot.

A few days later Blussé van Oud-Alblas continued: With respect to what I said about building the steam flotilla vessels the minister noted the moment when the vessels were tendered. He therefore admits that the time allowed for construction deviated from what he himself gave as a guideline for constructing ships on state shipyards. I have to note that while the tender was made, there might have been international tensions that caused hastened construction. However, since the tender these have disappeared, and yet construction has proceeded at the same hastened pace. Even in this year (1860) one has continued to finish the ships in a way too short timeframe. I fear that the consequence will be that these will not be as durable as others. Above all I fear that this will again be used as a reason not to build state ships on commercial shipyards. Therefore I want to annul this reason just now.

The minister of the navy Lotsy replied as follows: The remark that a too short time frame was allowed for the construction of the steam flotilla vessels, I can only answer in one way. It happened in the summer of last year (1859). At that moment even those that did not appreciate the international situation as very threatening were convinced of the necessity to improve the national defense as soon as possible.

== Ships in the class ==
=== Notes on individual ships ===
The machines of the Amstel were sold in November 1875. She was officially retired from active service when she became a storage ship (Dutch: kostschip) in 1878. She would have an extremely long life as such and later as a lodgings ship.

The Dommel was first decommissioned at Hellevoetsluis on 4 September 1867. On 11 July 1870 she was commissioned again On 21 October 1870 she actually left for Suriname. Already on 26 October she was back in Texel, officially to load more coal. The subsequent decommissioning in November told a different story. Indeed, she was found to be rotten and was broken up soon after.

The Linge was sold in Surabaya on 2 March 1867.

The Stavoren first arrived in the Dutch East Indies in May 1864. She was converted to a hydrographic vessel at Surabaya in 1868.

=== Construction ===
Name	Laid down	Launched	Commissioned	Fate	Built by
Haarlemmermeer	9 July 1859	22 March 1860	16 Aug 1860	Sold 17 September 1870	Rijkswerf Vlissingen
Amstel	July 1859	12 May 1860	11 February 1862	Sold 19 May 1910	Shipyard Koning William on the Hoogte Kadijk Amsterdam
Apeldoorn		23 June 1860	16 April 1861	Sold 2 March 1866	Shipyard Koning William on the Hoogte Kadijk Amsterdam
Dommel	July 1859	26 May 1860	1 April 1863	Decommissioned 25 November 1870	G.H. Uitenboogaerd, Maassluis
Berkel		16 June 1860	1 January 1861	Sold 6 May 1865	G.H. Uitenboogaerd, Maassluis
Vecht	5 September 1859	5 June 1860	17 January 1861	Sold 21 April 1866	Kromhout Shipyard of G. Borkus in Gouda
Linge		30 June 1860	1 November 1861	Decommissioned 1 November 1866	Kromhout Shipyard of D. Borkus in Gouda
Delfzijl		4 August 1860	1 April 1863	Decommissioned 30 June 1866	Shipyard K. Kater in Groningen
Stavoren	July 1859	15 August 1860	1 March 1863	Decommissioned 1873	Shipyard K. Kater in Groningen
