= Soestdijk-class gunvessel =

Type of ship in the Royal Netherlands Navy

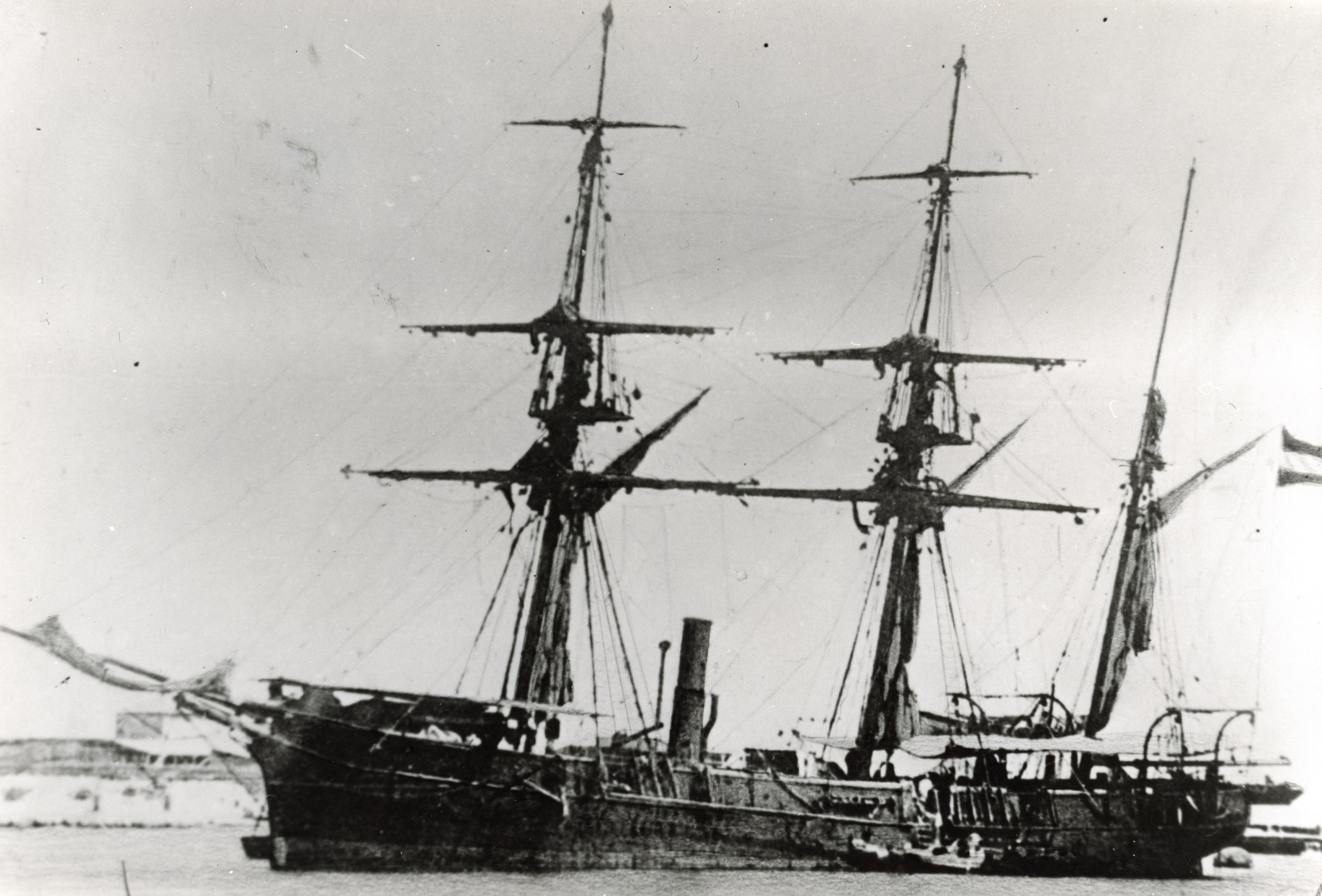
- Gunvessel Schouwen of the Soestdijk class

Class overview
- Name: Soestdijk class
- Builders: multiple
- Operators: Royal Netherlands Navy
- Preceded by: Haarlemmermeer class
- Succeeded by: Riouw class
- Planned: 8
- Completed: 8
- Scrapped: 8

General characteristics
- Type: Gunvessel
- Tonnage: 285
- Displacement: 586 tons
- Length: 38 m (124 ft 8 in)
- Beam: 8.16 m (26 ft 9 in)
- Draught: 3.20 m (10 ft 6 in)
- Installed power: 80 nominal hp; 204 indicated hp
- Speed: 6-7 kn
- Complement: 75
- Armament: 2 * 30-pdr medium gun; 2 * 30-pdr carronade

The Soestdijk class was a class of 8 gunvessels of the Royal Netherlands Navy. The class was built to the same design as the preceding Haarlemmermeer class, but proved far more durable.

== Context ==
In the late 1850s the Dutch navy seemed to have a found a suitable model for gunvessels that could be used in the Netherlands as well as in the Dutch East Indies and West Indies. This was the Haarlemmermeer class, which seemed very promising while it was still on the slipway. Without waiting for proof of the abilities of the Haarlemmermeer the Dutch navy ordered a second batch of these vessels, the Soestdijk class.

The Haarlemmermeer class had been ordered from commercial shipyards. Construction by state shipyards or commercial shipyards was a point of political controversy fueled by ideology. Indeed Johannes Servaas Lotsy was minister of the navy when all these ships were ordered. The difference was that Jan Jacob Rochussen was prime minister from 18 March 1858 to 23 February 1860. From 23 February 1860 to 14 March 1861 it was Floris Adriaan van Hall.

Anyway, a second series of ships according to the Haarlemmermeer design was started. In 1860 the navy decided to build 5 more ships to the same design on state owned shipyards. Three at the Rijskwerf Amsterdam, and two on the Rijskwerf Vlissingen. The reasons given for this apparent change of policy was that the government saw an advantage in lengthening the construction time of ships on the slipway, and that this way the national shipyards could use their supply of wood only suitable for small ships. Even before the lead ship of the Haarlemmermeer class had been commissioned, the Soestdijk and Coehoorn were laid down at the (state owned) Rijkswerf Amsterdam.

== Characteristics ==
=== General ===
The ships of the Soestdijk were built according to the same design as the Haarlemmermeer class. Tideman gives the length of 38 m in his overview of active ships. That is for the Kijkduin, Aart van Nes, Schouwen and Bommelerwaard. On the other hand the already decommissioned Brielle and Maas en Waal were in the overview of already decommissioned ships, and got a length of 40.7 m. The beam and draught are equal in both overviews.

The explanation for the difference is that in the overview of active ships Tideman gave the length between perpendiculars. In the overview of retired ships the length was measured including the rudderpost.

=== Propulsion ===
Propulsion of the class was the same as that of the Haarlemmermeer class.

=== Armament ===
Armament of the class was the same as that of the Haarlemmermeer class.

=== Criticism ===
The class was built to the same design as the Haarlemmermeer class, which got much criticism in the 1862 investigation of the navy by the Dutch House of Representatives. By the time that the first ships of the Soestdijk class were commissioned, this inquiry had long been finished.

Contrary to the short-lived Haarlemmermeer class, the ships of the Soestdijk class had a lifespan comparable to other screw steamship classes.

== Ships in the class ==
=== Notes on individual ships ===
The Aart van Nes was decommissioned in 1879 in Surabaya and converted to a ship for pilots on the eastern approaches of the city. While there she was sunk in early 1881 when S.S. Drenthe hit her.

=== Construction ===
Name	Laid down	Launched	Commissioned	Fate	Built by
Soestdijk	12 April 1860	19 March 1862	1 February 1864	Sold 29 November 1875	Rijkswerf Amsterdam
Coehoorn	1 August 1860	19 March 1862	11 August 1864	Unfit 20 April 1874	Rijkswerf Amsterdam
Bommelerwaard	19 February 1861	29 October 1862	1 May 1865	Sold 4 May 1878	Rijkswerf Amsterdam
Maas en Waal	19 February 1861	25 September 1862	1 September 1865	Sold 19 September 1874	Rijkswerf Amsterdam
Den Briel	18 March 1861	18 May 1863	1 September 1865	Sold 26 September 1874	Rijkswerf Vlissingen
Aart van Nes	6 April 1861	2 June 1863	1 September 1865	Sunk 1881	Rijkswerf Vlissingen
Kijduin	12 April 1861	2 December 1863	1 February 1867	Sold 16 November 1876	Rijkswerf Amsterdam
Schouwen	12 April 1861	23 December 1863	1 February 1867	Sold 23 December 1878	Rijkswerf Amsterdam
