= Riouw-class gunvessel =

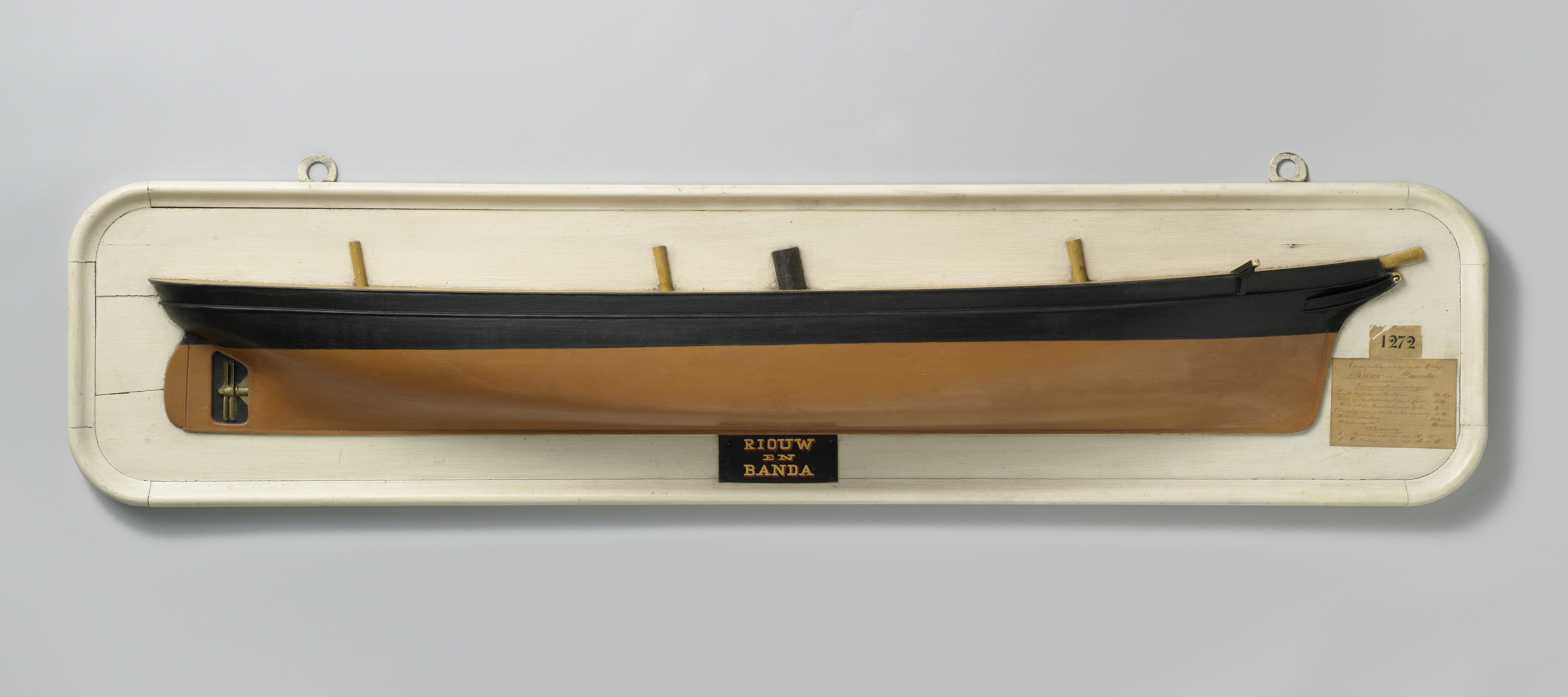
- 1872 half model of the Riouw and Banda with dimensions

Class overview
- Name: Riouw class
- Builders: Koninklijke Fabriek, Fijenoord
- Operators: Royal Netherlands Navy
- Preceded by: Soestdijk class
- Succeeded by: Pontianak class
- Completed: 4
- Scrapped: 4

General characteristics
- Type: Gunvessel
- Displacement: 695 tons
- Length: 42 m (137 ft 10 in)
- Beam: 8.40 m (27 ft 7 in)
- Draught: 3.60 m (11 ft 10 in)
- Depth of hold: 4 m (13 ft 1 in)
- Installed power: 80 nominal horsepower
- Complement: 75
- Armament: 1* 16 cm RML; 2* 30-pdr SBML
- Armour: none

The Riouw class was a class of four steam screw gunvessels of the Royal Netherlands Navy. They were the first composite built ships of the Dutch navy.

== The Dutch colonial navy in the 1870s ==
In the 1870s the navy in the Dutch East Indies consisted of an auxiliary squadron of four ships from the Netherlands, and the colonial navy of 22 ships. The auxiliary squadron was primarily responsible for external defense. The ships of the colonial navy (Indische Militaire Marine) were meant for transport and flotilla services.

From the introduction of screw propulsion up to the 1870s almost 20 small wooden steam screws ships were built for the Indische Militaire Marine. Next to these screw-driven ships an almost equal number of steam paddle-ships were built, most of them from iron. The wooden screw ships tended to decay quickly, and so the Dutch navy began to look into the possibilities of composite built ships.

=== Ordering ===
In early 1870 the department of the Indische Militaire Marine in Batavia asked the Dutch Navy in The Hague to immediately start the construction of four screw steamships fourth class. The reason was that a number of these vessels present in the Indies would soon have to be decommissioned because of their condition and advanced age. The department in Batavia was confident that the Dutch shipyards knew how to construct these vessels, and had only determined that the vessels should be made of Teak from Java, and should be 4 meters longer than the previous ships in order to have more room for storage, and to be able to load more coal. Also the lines should be somewhat finer and the carronades should be replaced by 3-4 rifled guns. The problem in the Netherlands was that just at that time, the navy wanted to switch to composite built ships, and so designing these ships took a whole lot more time.

In the budget for 1872 there was mention of the construction of a composite built ship of the third class, first named Etna, later Alkmaar. At the end of 1871 four composite-built screw steamships of 80 hp were ordered.

== Characteristics ==
=== The composite screw steamship in the Dutch East Indies ===
The main defect of the screw steamships preceding the Riouw class was their very short lifespan when used in the tropics. This subject is complicated. Traditionally warships were built from oak and were built at a very slow pace. This gave the oak wood used in the construction of ships the time to become even more resistant to the rot and decay brought on by maritime use. The obvious example of this is the HNLMS Wassenaar. She was started before 1834, served for many years and was only demolished in 1913.

However, in the age of steam most wooden screw ships faced three problems: The first problem was that the builders were not allowed to take so much construction time when technology was advancing so quickly. Therefore the oak wood used did not get enough time to season. The second problem was that by the mid-nineteenth century good oak was becoming more and more scarce. Therefore the quality of the oak used was worse than it had been. The third problem had to do with steam propulsion itself. The heat and humidity of the engines inside the ship harbored vermin, especially white ants (as termites were called at the time). The heat also accelerated the growth of dry rot, caused by a group of funghi.

Wooden screw steam ships in the tropics were therefore vulnerable to shipworms on the outside and extra vulnerable to termites and dry rot on the inside. The solution to these problems was the composite ship. The frame/structure was made of wrought iron and gave the composite ship the rigidity that was so essential for the free movement of the screw axle. The iron frame also made the structure (but not the whole ship) immune to termites and dry rot. The wooden planking / hull of the ship allowed the attachment of copper sheathing that kept the barnacle and other pests from attaching themselves to the ship, and kept the shipworm out. Because of the many wooden parts (decks, internal walls) still used in the composite ship, it was not free from these plagues, but it was less vulnerable.

The only reasonable alternative for composite construction was to build iron ships, but here the situation in the Dutch East Indies was relevant. In 1888 somebody noted: Because there is insufficient dry dock capacity in the Dutch East Indies (i.e. only at Surabaya), smaller military vessels are composite build. Even while it's well known how meticulous this construction has to be done, and how few shipbuilders are able to do this well. If the scarcity of available dry docks is solved, the state can wholeheartedly switch to constructing iron or steel ships.

=== Dimensions ===
The Riouw class was 42 m long, had a beam of 8.4 m, a draught of 3.6 m and displaced 695 ton. The depth of hold (from the upper deck to the upper surface of the keel) was 4 m, and gives an idea of the rather cramped conditions on board. Still, it was a lot better than the space provided by previous ships. These measured 38 m * 8.16 * 3.20 at 586 ton. The Riouw class was indeed 4 m longer like the Colonial navy had asked. The displacement was almost 20% more, while the number of crew stayed the same, and so the class had a bigger capacity for cargo or living conditions.

In May 1873 a budget law was proposed to increase the East Indies budget, so the Aceh War could be continued. It requested money to build the four ships of the Pontianak class. It founded the choice for the Pontianak design by giving a description of the four steamships improved fourth class, composite construction type Riouw, which would be a model for the Pontianak class. Naval officers and ship building engineers were said to agree that the improved screw steam ships fourth class were an excellent type of ship for the tasks of the Dutch Colonial Navy. As regards spaciousness and ventilation they did not suffer from the defects of the old steam ships fourth class, and offered the officers and men lodgings suitable to the Indian climate.

=== Propulsion ===
==== Machinery ====
The ships of the Riouw class had engines of 80 nominal hp. This was equal to the nominal power of most previous screw steamships of the fourth class.

==== Sailing ====
In the description of the Riouw class they were said to be especially recommended for 'station duty' (stationsdienst, many outposts had a ship posted in place for a long time) because of their moderate coal consumption. They were also fine cruisers on account of their sail plan and hull. This could not have been based on experience, because the lead ship Riouw had only been commissioned a few days before this statement. There is a report that the Riouw was a bad sailer (Dutch: zeilt niet best) Furthermore, by what is known of the sailing characteristics of the succeeding Pontianak class, it's also not that likely that the Riouw class had good sailing characteristics.

=== Armament ===
Tideman gave the armament of the Riouw class as one 16 cm rifled gun and two medium 30-pounder SBML. In the 1870s the medium 30-ponder SBML was a typical Age of Sail gun that would not particularly scare anybody. The rifled 16 cm muzzle loader was something different. It outranged all traditional smooth bore muzzle loading guns, and was far more accurate. The downside of most Dutch 16 cm RML's was that they were worn out very quickly.

=== Criticism ===
In 1884 a critic noted that of the four ships built in the unhappy year 1872, two were declared unfit when only 11 years old (Amboina and Deli), and one would only last two years longer (The Riouw). With respect to the duration of the service of these ships, one of course has to consider that actual service will wear out ships sooner than laying in port. However, the average duration of the service of the Riouw class is indeed significantly much lower than that of the succeeding Pontianak class. In all probability the Dutch shipyards were more experienced in composite construction when they built the Pontianak class.

== Ships in the class ==
=== Construction ===
Name	Laid down	Launched	Commissioned	Fate	Principal	Built by
Riouw	11 May 1872	30 October 1872	26 April 1873	Unfit April 1887	Dutch Colonial Navy	Fijenoord
Banda	May 1872	13 December 1872	20 May 1873	1889 hydrographic s., dec. 6 June 1899	Dutch Colonial Navy	Fijenoord
Amboina		21 January 1873	20 May 1873	decom. 10 March 1881 Sold 13 May 1882	Dutch Colonial Navy	Koninklijke Fabriek van Stoom- en andere werktuigen
Deli		10 April 1873	1 October 1873	Unfit 15 March 1883	Dutch Colonial Navy	Koninklijke Fabriek van Stoom- en andere werktuigen
