= Vesuvius-class sloop =

Class of Royal Netherlands Navy steamships

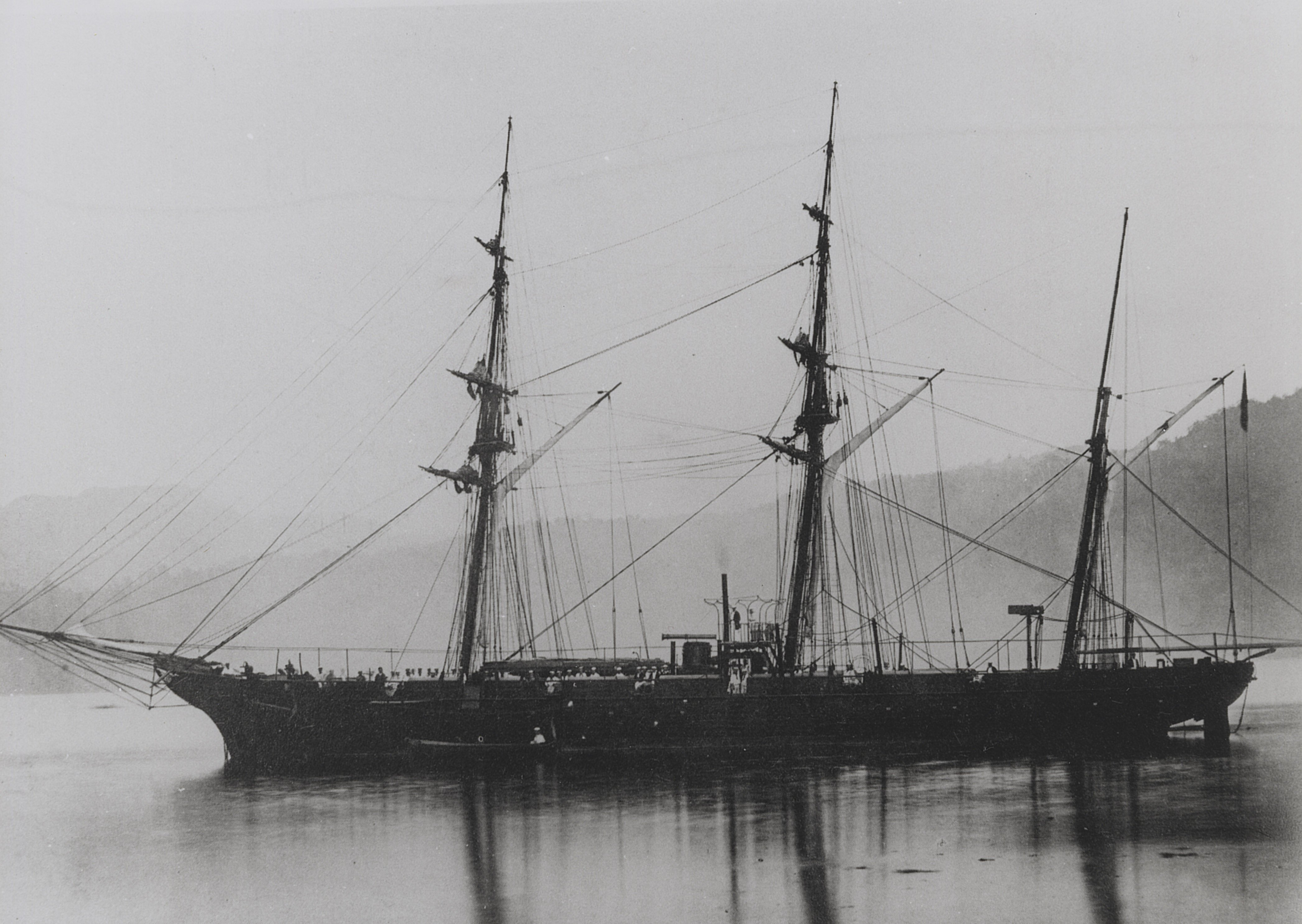
- The Vesuvius (1858-1872)

Class overview
- Name: Vesuvius class
- Builders: Rijkswerf Amsterdam, Rijkswerf Vlissingen, Rijkswerf Willemsoord, Kinderdijk, Krimpen a/d Lek
- Operators: Royal Netherlands Navy
- Preceded by: Bali
- Succeeded by: Watergeus class
- Building: 6
- Completed: 6
- Scrapped: 6

General characteristics
- Type: screw sloop-of-war
- Displacement: 759 tons
- Length: 45.50 m (149 ft 3 in)
- Beam: 9.20 m (30 ft 2 in)
- Draught: 4.30 m (14 ft 1 in)
- Depth of hold: 4.80 m (15 ft 9 in)
- Installed power: 119 nominal horsepower; 250 indicated horsepower (190 kW)
- Speed: 7 knots (13 km/h)
- Complement: 100 (126 in Dutch East Indies)
- Armament: Original: 4 * 12-pdr SBML; 4 * medium 30-pdr SBML; Later: 2 * 16 cm RML; 4 * medium 30-pdr SBML
- Armour: ship made of wood

The Vesuvius class was a class of steam screw sloops of the Royal Netherlands Navy. The class comprised Vesuvius, Cornelis Dirks, Reinier Claessen, Het Loo, Reteh and Prinses Maria.

== Dutch Naval Plans in the 1850s ==
=== Plan 1855 ===
The Dutch naval plan 1855 stated that the steam corvette of 250 hp and 12 30-pounders (the Groningen-class corvettes) would be the standard warship for the Dutch East Indies. However, the plan also recognized that in the East Indies, there were 'too many points to occupy, too many seas to patrol, and too many corners to penetrate' to use only these still costly ships. The plan 1855 therefore specified a second type of ships for the indies: the sloop of 100 hp. Regular service in the East Indies required 12 such sloops. The West Indies three more, and 2 were required for replacement. In total 17 sloops would be required in peace time, and 20 in times of war.

=== Dutch rating system ===
In Dutch the Vesuvius class was known as a class of 'schroefstoomschepen'. The Dutch navy referred to them as 'schroefstoomschip' of a certain class, i.e. 1-4th class, but this classification varied. In 1859 the class was designated as 'schroefstoomschepen 4th class'. In 1861 the class (and some other ships) were 'schroefstoomschepen 3rd class'. In Dutch the lead ship Vesuvius (as well as the Bali, Soembing and Montrado) were first called schooners, or even schroefstoomschooner. In the English Navy warships of a comparable size were called sloops.

== Design ==
The Montrado had introduced screw propulsion on small navy ships. She did very well, but authorities in the Indies wanted to have more cargo space in the ships, and more power, so they could use them for transport duties. Therefore, the Bali was made, but she was not able to mount heavy guns, and therefore could only be used in the colonies. The Vesuvius was designed to have more steam power, more cargo space, and to be able to mount a heavy battery. The other 5 ships were built to this model. The displacement of the Vesuvius class was about half that of the Groningen class. The design was made by L.K. Turk in Vlissingen.

== Machinery ==
According to the plan 1855 the class would have 100 hp, but this became 119 hp. In fact it became 250 ihp, giving the ships a speed of 7 knots.

== Sails ==
The Vesuvius first had a barque rigging, later a full ship sail plan. Early in her career she had very much trouble with tacking (sailing), even in the most favorable circumstances.

== Armament ==
The original armament of the Vesuvius was 4 short 30-pounders(SBML) and four long 12-pounders(SBML) In the 1870s the Prinses Marie had 1 16 cm RML and 6 rifled 12 cm guns (BL). The Cornelis Dirks and Het Loo then had 2 16 cm RML and 4 medium 30-pounders. Ships of the size and role of the Vesuvius were never armored, not even in the early twentieth century. Therefore, the appearance of the French ironclad Gloire in August 1860 did not mean that the Vesuvius class became obsolete.

== Ships in the class ==
Of the 6 ships one was built by the Rijkswerf Vlissingen, two were built at the Rijkswerf in Amsterdam, the Cornelis Dirks was built by J. & K. Smit in Krimpen a/d Lek, the Reinier Claeszen by J. & K. Smit in Kinderdijk, and one ship was built at the Rijkswerf Willemsoord.

=== Note about the dimensions and power of the Vesuvius ===
There might be some doubt about the lead ship of the class Vesuvius because of an error that Tideman made in his famous Memoriaal (1880). In a table Tideman gives the Vesuvius as a Schroefstoomschip 4th class that was no longer in use, but it was a Schroefstoomschip 3rd class. The table then gives a displacement of 586t, a length of 40.7 m and a power of 80 hp. This would lead to the conclusion that the Vesuvius was a ship like the Apeldoorn and the Vecht in the same table. The note above the table (the sizes etc. in this table are an approximation) kind of indicates how the table was made. In reality there were always minor differences between the ships of a class. For this table of defunct ships however, the dimensions of most ships directly depend on the type of the ship. In the table all fourth class screw ships got length 40.70 m, displacement 586t and 80 hp. Official publications give a power of 119 hp for the Vesuvius, so there is an error. The error in the table is in the classification of the Vesuvius as a Schroefstoomschip 4th class. In the same table Het Loo, Reinier Claeszen, and the Reteh are correctly classified and do have the correct dimensions and power. A probable explanation is that at first the Vesuvius was indeed classed as a Schroefstoomschip 4th class (cf above). This was changed soon after, and from 1861 onward the Vesuvius was classed as a Schroefstoomschip 3rd class.

In his Verhandeling over de scheepsbouwkunde als wetenschap (1859) written at the time the Vesuvius was built, Tideman does give the correct dimensions: Length 43,0 m, beam 9.16 m, draught 3.46 m, 120 hp, displacement 651 cubic meters. Except for the displacement these exactly fit the other ships of the class in his later Memoriaal. Her captain Arntzenius noted that the ship had to pay the pilot in Jamaica according to the tonnage (Dutch tonnemaat, not displacement) range of 400-700 tons. Indeed, in 1880 Tideman would give the tonnage of the other ships in the class as 400tons, and that of a ship displacing 586t as 280 tonnage. Furthermore, the Explanatory Memorandum (Dutch: Memorie van toelichting) for the 1860 naval budget clearly states that the 5 other ships were built to the model of the Vesuvius.

Name	Laid down	Launched	Commissioned	Fate
Vesuvius	8 October 1857	6 July 1858	1 September 1858	Sold 8 June 1872
Cornelis Dirks	1 May 1858	11 January 1859	21 September 1859	To be BU September 1883
Reinier Claeszen	4 May 1858	13 January 1859	16 August 1859	Sold 29 January 1870
Het Loo	13 March 1858	17 March 1859	1 August 1859	Sold 21 October 1908
Reteh (ex Sprinkhaan)	13 March 1858	19 April 1860	16 September 1860	Declared unfit March–April 1871
Prinses Maria	17 June 1858	19 November 1862	1 April 1864	Unfit in November 1882
