= Shipping (disambiguation) =

Shipping is the transportation of cargo.

Shipping or Shipped may also refer to:

- Shipping line, a business that operates ships that it may or may not own
- Shipping portal, a web-based point of access to multiple shipping lines' booking, tracking & communication systems
- Ship transport, transporting people and cargo by ship
- Shipping (fandom), an interest in or emotional response to fictional relationships
- The Shipment (Star Trek: Enterprise), a Star Trek: Enterprise television episode from season three
- The Shipment (film), a 2001 movie about a mob enforcer who is hired to recover a shipment of Viagra gone awry
- Shipt, an American delivery service owned by Target Corporation

== See also ==
- List of ship companies
