= Supplier enablement =

Supplier enablement is the process of electronically connecting suppliers (or other trading partners) to a company's supply chain. Supplier enablement is achieved when suppliers of goods and services are connected to a company's back-office systems to exchange critical business documents such as purchase orders, invoices and other information. Suppliers can be connected, or "enabled," using a variety of means including Electronic Data Interchange (EDI), Extensible Markup Language (XML), Web forms, RFID chips, or other e-commerce tools.

The benefits of supplier enablement include reduced supply chain costs, improved invoice tracking, reduced procurement costs, reducing or eliminating non-value added (manual) processes, and improved communications. Supplier enablement extends the value of a company's internal IT investments, such as ERP, into their trading communities—expanding the ROI on an initially internal investment.

== Purchasing card (Pcard) ==
As more companies move purchasing card into A/P to replace checks and other forms of payment, purchasing card supplier enablement will become key to the success of the payment conversion project. As stated on the purchasing card stub, every supplier must be contacted and informed of the payment change from check to the purchasing card, even if the supplier is already a purchasing card supplier. Depending on the card payment type selected, information is required from the supplier before a client can move forward with the payment conversion. Some banks offer help in the payment conversion process and other software companies provide technology to make the conversion efficient and easy for the financial institution, client, and supplier.

Financial institutions and the associations provide payment technology allowing clients to process push pcard payments to the suppliers or send the suppliers a pcard remittance advice. The bridge to take advantage of the payment technology is pcard supplier enablement. Every supplier must buy into the process and provide remittance advice information, i.e. email address, or other information for push payments (buyer initiated payments).

== B2B payments ==
Carol Benson of Glenbrook Partners discusses this payment change and supplier enablement in her November 1, 2007 article, eB2B at the Tipping Point?. Excerpts from the article follow.

I found four new forces at work [at the AFP (Association for Finance Professionals) conference] that I believe are significant.

- Card payments for A/P purchases – this is by far the biggest news.
- A new attitude towards accounts payable outsourcing - suddenly, the term “outsourcing Accounts Payable” seems to come tripping off of many tongues, without stumbling – it’s beginning to sound like the obvious, right thing to do. SaaS providers, such as GT Nexus and TradeCard, are examples of how to automate the process.
- A new life for the supplier network concept – remember when we said above that supplier sign-up was one of the core problems? The proposition? Any supplier who signs up with the network to receive payments from one buyer can easily expand that to multiple buyers.
- The final factor is the least exciting, but possibly the most significant – new progress on remittance data standards.

In summary, here’s what I expect to see over the next few years for B2B payments:

- A dramatic shift in volume from check (and sometimes, from ACH) to card based A/P payments
- The formation of three to six major supplier networks.
- An acceleration of suppliers’ willingness to be paid driven by the ability of accounting software to accept and integrate more standardized remittance data
