= Noordhollandsch Kanaal =

Canal in the Northwest Netherlands

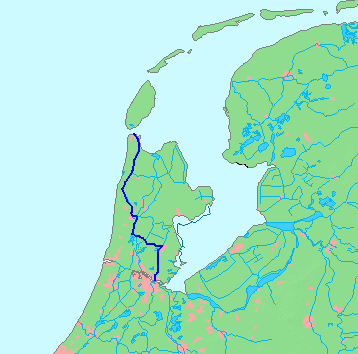
- The canal runs the length of the province of North Holland
- Interactive map of Noordhollandsch Kanaal

Specifications
- Length: 75 km (47 mi)
- Original number of locks: 4
- Status: operational

History
- Former names: Groot Noordhollandsch Kanaal
- Principal engineer: Jan Blanken
- Date approved: 1819
- Construction began: 1820
- Date completed: 1824

Geography
- Start point: Amsterdam, Netherlands
- End point: Den Helder, Netherlands

The Noordhollandsch Kanaal ("Great North Holland Canal") is a canal originally meant for ocean-going ships. It is located in North Holland, Netherlands. The canal was of great significance in Dutch history.

== Location ==
The canal is about 75 kilometers long. Nowadays, it is a canal that connects several cities in North Holland. It starts at Den Helder in the north, and then goes through Alkmaar and Purmerend, and ends opposite the IJ at Amsterdam. As such it is one of the many canals in the Netherlands. However, from its construction till about 1880 it had a totally different character, because it was a canal meant for ocean-going ships. Ships would sail from the Americas or East-Asia, and then be towed along the canal from Den Helder to Amsterdam.

== Context and Plans ==
=== The Zuiderzee becomes less navigable ===
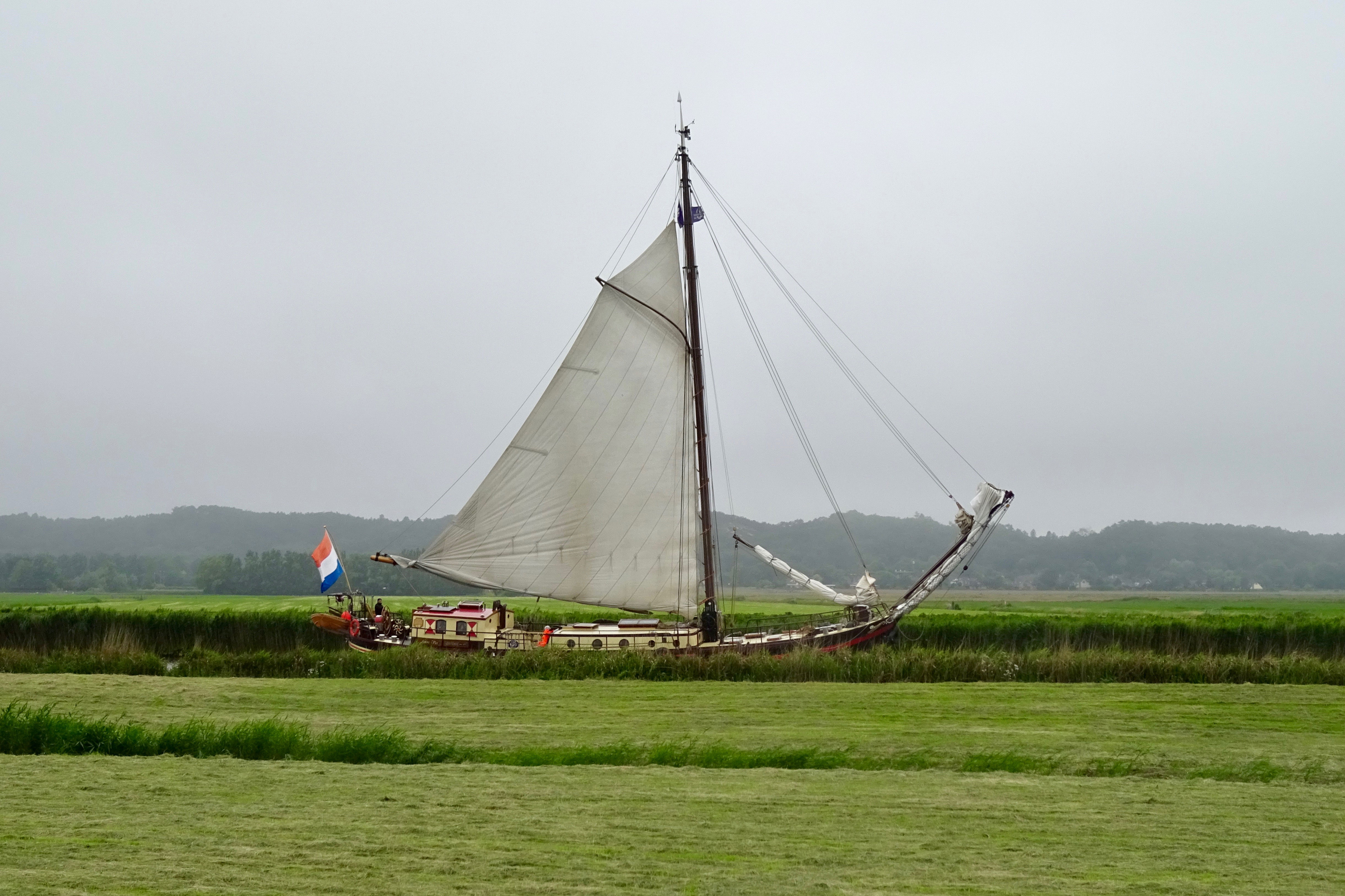
On the canal, south of Krabbendam

During the 17th century the Zuiderzee became ever less navigable for sea-going ships of the cities on its shores. Amsterdam was especially challenged by the shallows near Pampus, which hindered the connection between the IJ and the rest of the Zuiderzee. Sometimes this problem could be solved by using ship camels, but in general the solution was sought in transloading goods on smaller vessels while the sea-going ships anchored on the Rede van Texel. These smaller vessels would then continue to Amsterdam and other cities, where most of the goods would again be transloaded. This incurred a huge problem for the competitiveness of the harbor of Amsterdam.

=== The harbor of Nieuwediep ===
Warships were also bothered by the situation in the Zuiderzee. Therefore, a harbor for warships was constructed at Nieuwediep from 1781 to 1785. From the start this was used by merchant ships. Even though Nieuwediep did not have quays at first, but it did have pile moorings. Ships could thus transload in port instead of at sea, thereby reducing cost, and increasing speed. Many heavy ships also wintered at Nieuwediep, especially the heavy East Indiaman of the Dutch East India Company.

=== Plans to (re)connect Amsterdam to the sea ===
Incoming ships in Amsterdam 1816–1829
Year	Number
1816	2,563
1817	3,077
1818	1,759
1819	2,113
1820	2,494
1821	2,161
1822	2,159
1823	2,106
1824	1,729
1825	1,606
1826	1,887
1827	1,982
1828	2,132
1829	2,029

After the Netherlands became independent again in 1813, King William I of the Netherlands attempted to revitalize the Dutch economy, which had been entirely ruined during the French period. The king centered part of his efforts on improving, extending and updating roads and waterways in the Netherlands. This included a project to improve the connection of Amsterdam to the sea. The Voorne Canal was a similar project for Rotterdam.

A few years after the canal had been opened, an overview of the number of ships arriving in Amsterdam from 1817 to 1828 was published. It shows that the first years after regaining independence probably gave rise to high expectations for the recovery of Amsterdam as a major harbor. The figures do not show a clear effect of the first operational year of the canal in 1825. For 1826 and 1827 the author of the overview gives other numbers than Westrman gave in 1936.

Legend has it that King William I used a pencil to indicate that a canal should be dug from Amsterdam straight to the west. But this would have cut through the dunes, about where the North Sea Canal is now. At the time this would have been a very major technological challenge. Others have this as a fact, and say that Inspector General Jan Blanken prevented this plan. His reasons are supposed to have been:

- the cost of digging through the dunes;
- The cost of the stone dams that would have to stretch into the sea; and
- the need to have a canal to the navy base at Willemsoord.

=== The plan for a canal to Nieuwediep ===
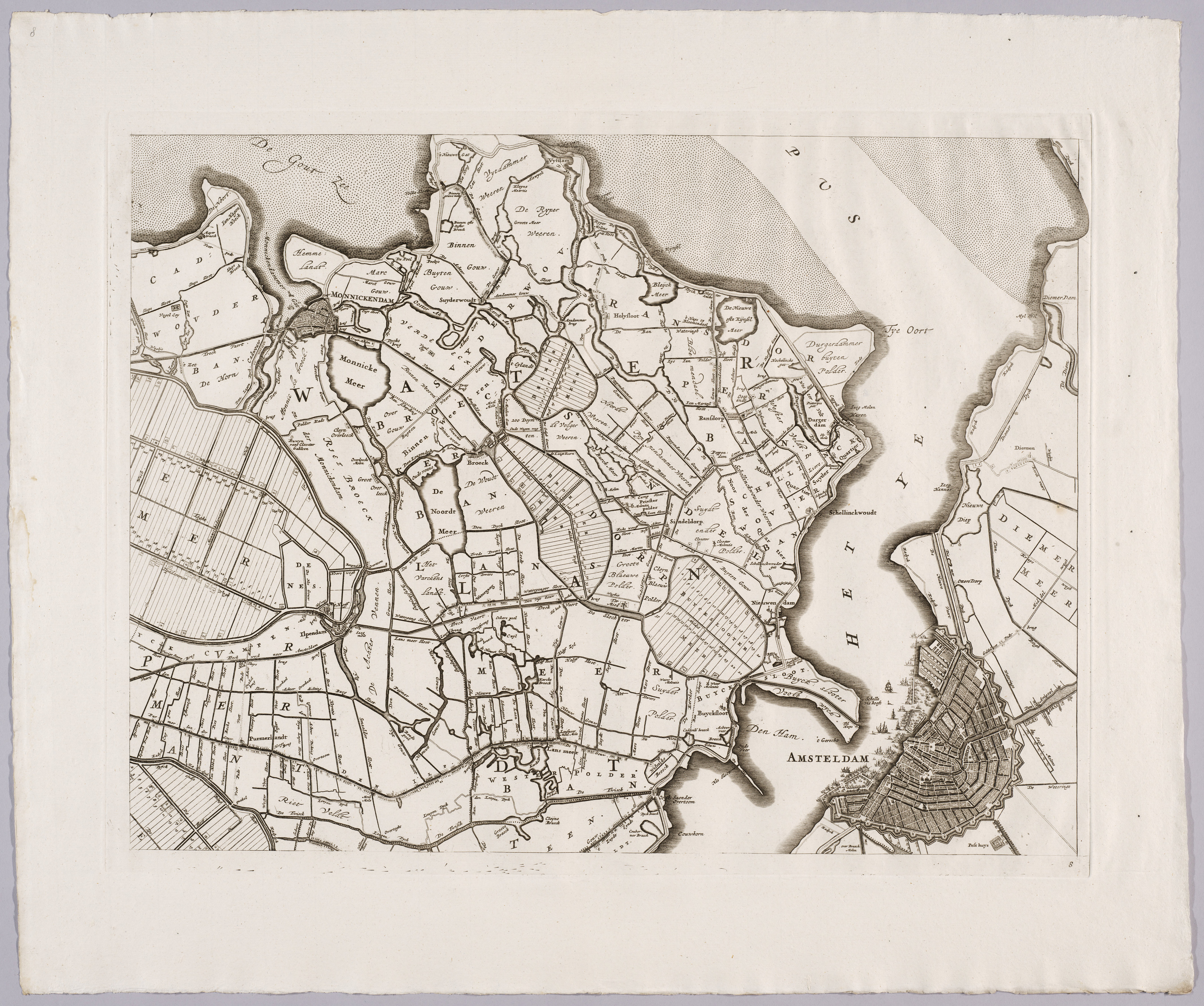
1745 situation just north of Amsterdam

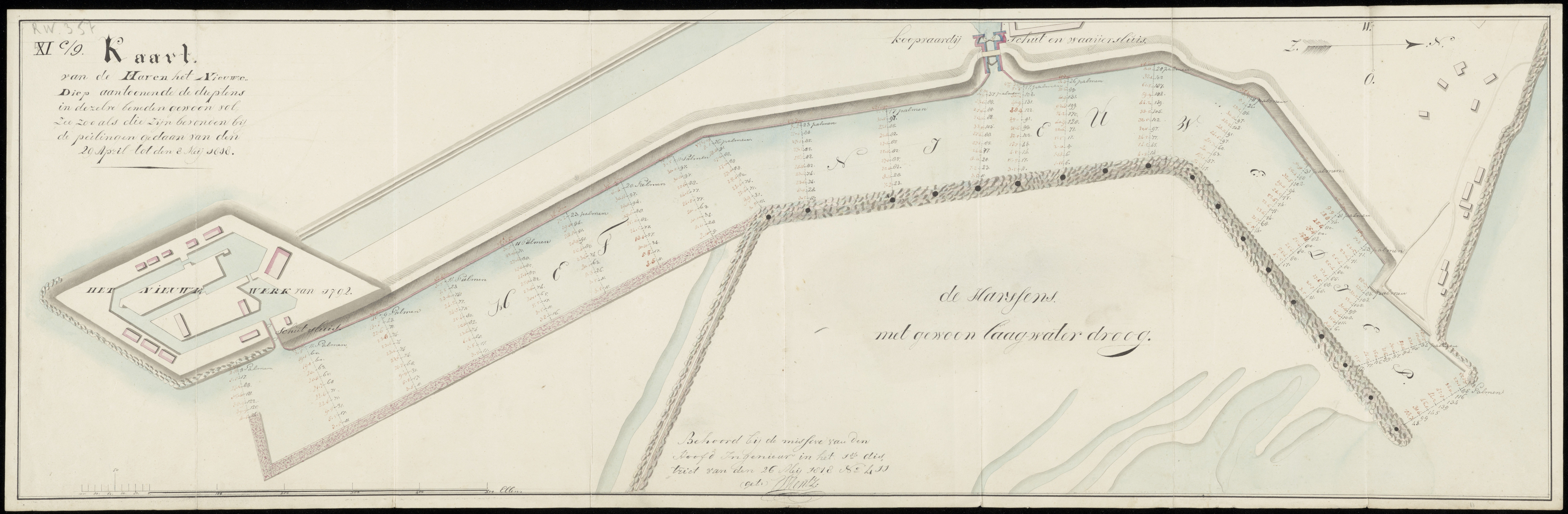
The first lock at Nieuwdiep in 1818

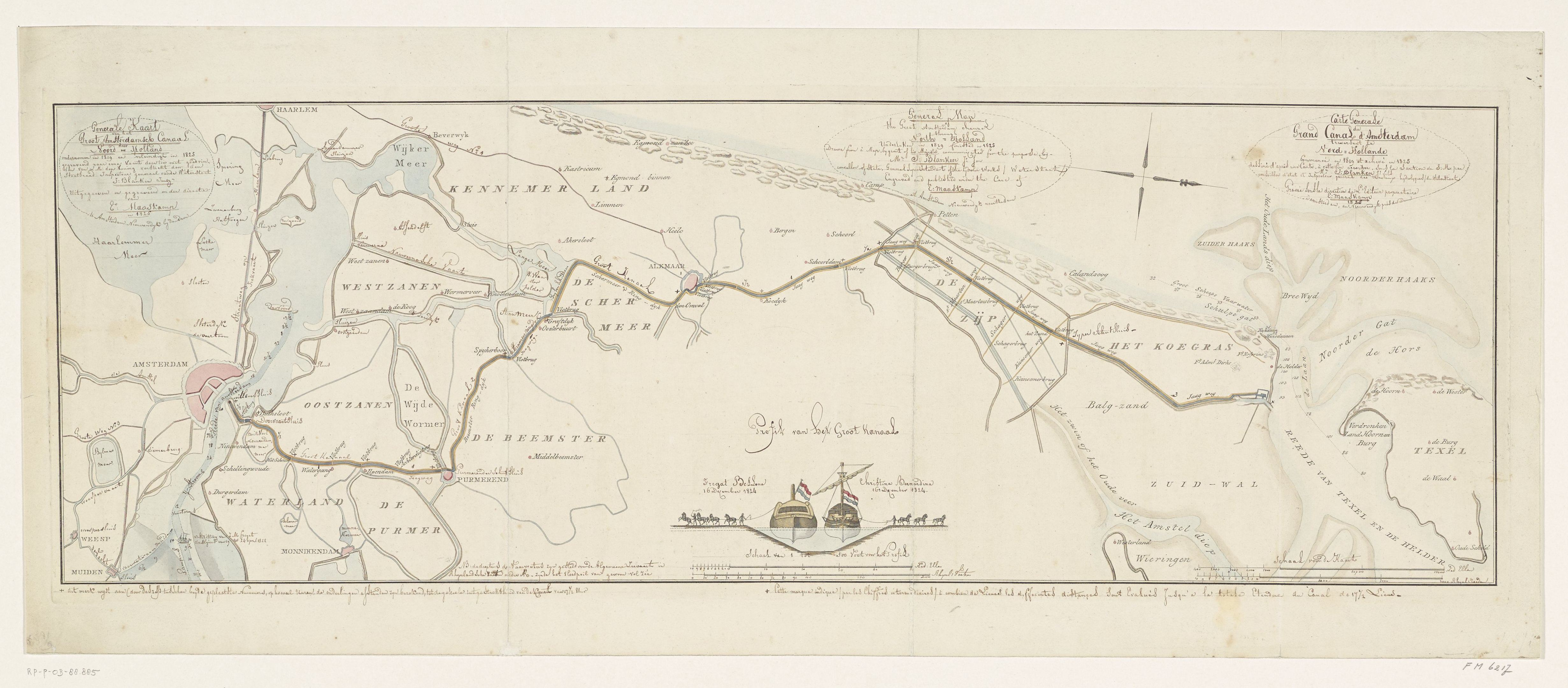
map of the canal

The government then decided to construct a canal from Amsterdam to Nieuwediep, and ordered Jan Blanken to make a design. Blanken proposed a canal from Tolhuis, on the north shore of the IJ across Amsterdam, towards Nieuwediep. On the south shore, a dyke would have to be made in the IJ from Het Blauwhoofd in the northwest of the city, to Zeeburg in the east. This would create a large wet dock in the north of Amsterdam. Amsterdam and its Chamber of Commerce did not like this plan, because they feared that at least part of their trade would move to Nieuwediep. They also did not like the dyke, because they thought it would cause delays for smaller vessels. In the end the city agreed, but on condition that the dyke would only be made after the canal was ready. The city would contribute 1,000,000 guilders to the canal, and the state would contribute 300,000 guilders to dredging in front of the city.

At first, the objections of Amsterdam also had to do with the size of the canal. The first lock at Nieuwdiep was only 33 Amsterdam feet, or 9.34 m wide. This width would limit the canal to ships of 200 lasts (somewhat below 400 ton cargo capacity). At the time, a significant part of sea going ships was about 250 lasts or bigger. The answer of Amsterdam to the plans therefore included that it wanted a lock of 40 feet wide, and a canal depth of 15 feet. Amsterdam was also afraid that shipbuilders would move to Den Helder, and asked for a ban on building new, or expanding the existing, shipyards at Nieuwediep. In 1822 this ban would even be expanded to founding factories for salt or sugar, or other big factories, without express government permission. With regard to trade at Den Helder, this was already forbidden by laws dating from the French period.

The net result was that Amsterdam got a canal wide and deep enough for ocean-going ships. Once the ocean-going ships arrived before Amsterdam however, its harbor would prove insufficient. Like Blanken had predicted, the dredging efforts did not succeed in ameliorating the situation. After the Goudriaan plan for a canal that bypassed Pampus got underway, Amsterdam finally gave in. Blanken's plan was changed to build only the Westerdok and Oosterdok wet docks. In between, Amsterdam would retain its open connection to the sea.

== Construction ==
=== Leadership ===
The construction of the canal was led by Inspector General Jan Blanken. In Spring 1819 he moved to Nieuwediep to lead construction from there. Other engineers stationed at Nieuwediep were: J. Glimmerveen, M. Merens and J. van Asperen. In order to save cost, the canal mostly followed existing waters. However, these all had to be made much deeper and wider.

=== Sections ===
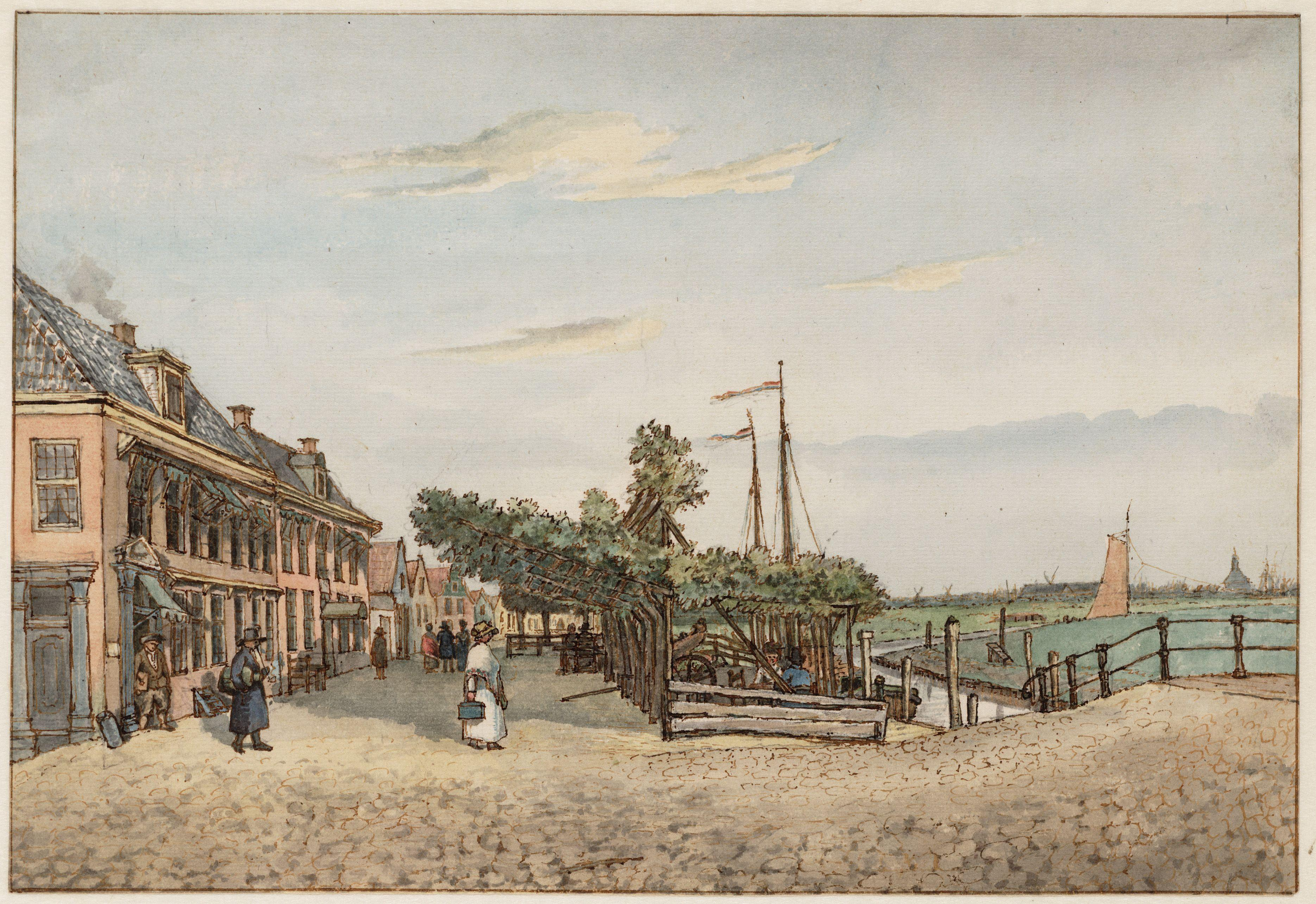
Buiksloot c. 1816

The southern section stretched from the IJ to Purmerend. It was led by Engineer van Asperen. It included the construction of Willem I Lock on the IJ near Tolhuis, and a flood gate near Buiksloot. This was by far the most difficult section, due to the weak ground. Furthermore, the existing waterway had to be deepened, but was too important to be closed down for the operation. The weak ground made that in some places the slope of the shore had to be made even less than 22.5 degrees. Otherwise these shores would collapse, especially when there was no counter-pressure from the water.

This section was completely dug by widening and deepening existing waterways. At its southern end this section followed the Oude Vaart, which ran from the IJ to Purmerend. From the IJ to Buiksloot it was 10–20 m wide and 1.25–1.5 m deep at low tide in the IJ. There was no lock on its junction with the IJ. It therefore tended to quickly silt up with sediment brought in by the tide. The result was that at low tide it was too shallow for river vessels, while at high tide the towpath was flooded. There was a small lock in the sea dyke at Buiksloot, giving access to Waterland. The old lock was 25 m long, 3.45 m wide and 2 m deep in summer. It had a fixed bridge. Its demolition was ordered in 1823. Between Buiksloot and Purmerend the Oude Vaart was 16–18 m wide, and about 1.25–1.5 m deep in summer. Just east of Purmerland village, the Oude Vaart crossed the dyke Achterdichting. Here a lock bridged the water level difference between the Waterland and Purmerland basins. This small lock measured only 12.5 * 3 * 2 m. The Oude Vaart had a small lock of equal dimensions at Purmerend.

The central section stretched from Purmerend to the Zijpe Lock at 't Zand. This section was led by Engineer Merens and included the lock at Purmerend. In the southern part of this section, the stretch from Purmerend to Spijkerboor was just as troublesome as the stretch south of it.

This section made use of the canals which had been dug around the Beemster and Starnmeer lakes to drain them. These were 20–30 m wide and 1.52–1.9 m deep in summer. Another such canal that was used ran along the former Schermermeer lake. This canal was also called Alkmaarse Vaart, and was 45–48 m wide and about 1.5–1.75 m deep in summer. From Alkmaar to the Zijpe polder the Koedijkervaart was 18–20 m wide and 1.60 m deep in summer.

In the Zijpe polder the old Groote Sloot ran from the Schoorlse Zeedijk at Zijpersluis to the Zuiderzee. It had the Jacob Claesse lock at Zijpersluis, and the Grote Sluis at Oudesluis, connecting to the Zuiderzee. The first connection between Nieuwediep and Alkmaar was made by the construction of a small stretch of canal between the lock that was 1 km north of 't Zand, and the Keinsmer Trekvaart in 't Zand, which connected to the Groote Sloot. This small stretch was tendered on 7 May 1818, that is before the plans for the Noordhollands Kanaal were approved.

The Groote Sloot was not used for the final canal. Instead a new route was dug west of it, from the Schoorlse Zeedijk at Zijpersluis to the Zijpe lock just north of 't Zand. The hamlet of Zijpersluis has the ancient Jacob Claesse lock, which cuts off the Groote Sloot from the Noordhollandsch Kanaal. However, when the new route was dug, Zijpersluis got a flood gate which could be closed with beams, the so-called Doorvaartsluis, or simply Doorvaart (passage), which was later removed.

The northern section stretched from the northern entrance of the Zijpe polder at 't Zand to Nieuwediep. It was directed by Engineer Glimmerveen and also included the new double lock at Nieuwediep. In this section preparatory works had already been executed in 1817 and 1818, including the construction of the dyke along the Koegras, and also the construction of a fan flood gate (Zijper Keersluis) at 't Zand, which was made into a regular lock during the later construction of the canal.

=== Riots ===
In late May 1823 there was serious labor unrest at the canal construction site near Akersloot. On 28 May it came to a fight in which contractor Huiskes shot dead two laborers, and was subsequently killed himself. The laborers destroyed two construction trailers, some chain pumps, material and tools. To restore order, some infantry was sent from Alkmaar, while cavalry was sent from Haarlem.

=== Cost ===
The total cost of the canal would be 11,000,000 guilders. Highlights were: the Willem I Lock for 465,000 guilders, Buiksloot Flood Gate for 252,000 guilders, the Purmerend Lock for 395,000 guilders, the Zijpe Lock for 183,000 guilders, and Koopvaarders Lock for 385,000 guilders.

Amsterdam paid 1,000,000 guilders towards the cost. Alkmaar and surroundings would contribute about 230,000 guilders. Purmerend made a small contribution.

== Characteristics ==
=== Course ===
The canal connected a number of existing waterways, including various canals and the small Rekere river.

=== Dimensions ===
The original dimensions of the canal were smaller than they were later. Original designed width was 37.60 m at the top, and 10 m on the canal bed. Original depth was 5.70 m at summer level. The stretch Zijpe Lock – Nieuwediep was only 5.50 m deep at the same summer level.

=== Passage time ===
The time to pass the canal from Nieuwediep to Amsterdam was very variable. For ships which were towed from the shore, it was between 16.5 and 26 hours in favorable circumstances. For big ships that were towed by steamers, it was between 11 and 20 hours. Small could sometimes be towed in only 9.5 hours. As these were figures from 1860 or before, this resulted in faster passage in summer, because there was no artificial light to continue in the dark.

By 1860, steam navigation was therefore very important on the canal. However, it also caused much damage to the shores of the canal. Furthermore, there were many accidents, especially in the bends of the canal.

=== Locks ===
At the southern end of the canal, the later Willem I lock was built. Just north of these was Buiksloot Flood Gate, which would normally be open. North of that was Purmerend Lock. North of Alkmaar was the Zijpersluis Flood Gate, at Zijpersluis. This was a flood gate that could be closed with beams. North of that was Zijpe Lock at 't Zand. The final locks were at Nieuwediep.

The situation with regard to the Zijpe Lock is extremely confusing. In Dutch there is a Zijper Keersluis, Zijper Schutsluis, or Zijper Kolksluis. These names are also practical homonyms of the nearby place Zijpersluis, which has the Jacob Claesse lock and had a flood gate. In April 1818 the government tendered the construction of a flood gate with fan doors in the old Zijpe sea dyke on the canal, before the rest of the canal was tendered. This was the Zijper Keersluis (Zijpe Flood Gate) at 't Zand. In December 1821 there was another tender, now for the construction of a regular lock in the Zijpe Sea dyke. It seems that this way the flood lock became a regular lock.

In Nieuwediep there was a flood gate for the Navy wet dock, the Zeedoksluis. At the time this was not a lock, but only a flood gate that let navy ships in and out of the wet dock when the tide was level with the sea. The first lock built at Nieuwediep was a lock with fan gates called Koopvaarderij Schut en Waaijersluis (see map). This lock was a bit too small for sea-going merchant ships, and so a new double lock called Koopvaarders Lock Koopvaarders Schutsluis was built. The older fan gate was then renamed Marine Schutsluis. There was still one other major lock around, which was the lock in the Nieuwe Werk.

=== Raft Bridges ===
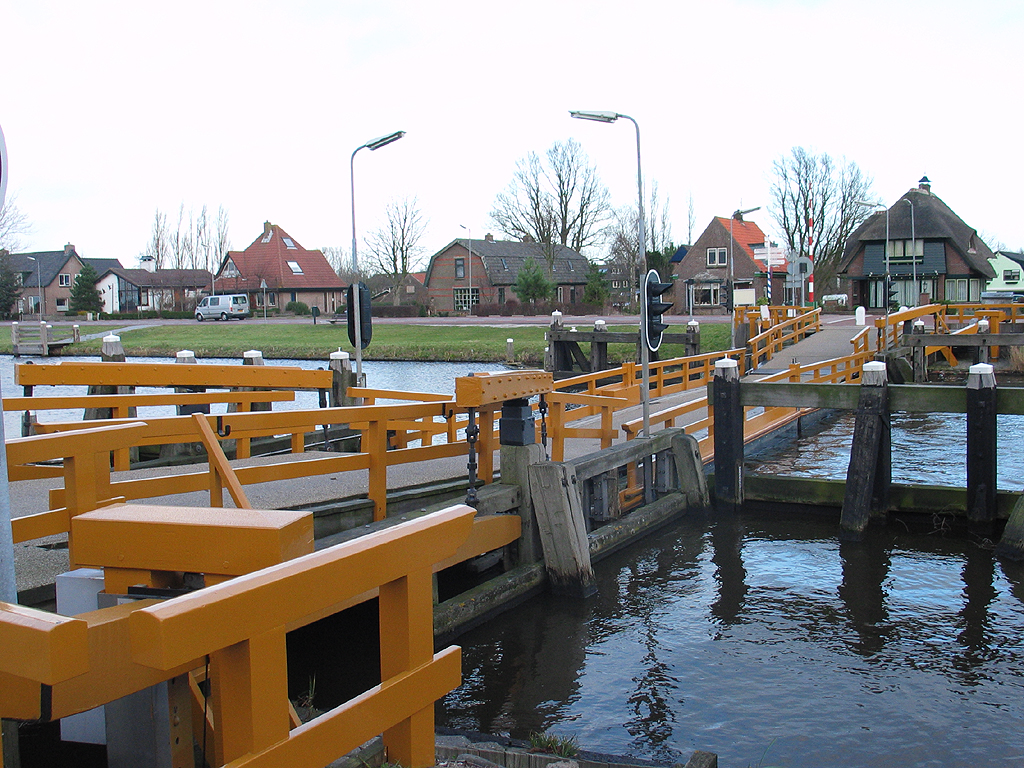
Raft bridge at Koedijk

A unique element of the canal are the floating bridges, so-called vlotbruggen ("raft bridges"). These bridges were constructed because engineers in the 1820s, when the canal was constructed, were not able to build bridges long enough to span the canal. The bridges opened by sliding the floating middle sections underneath the fixed end sections. The Rekervlotburg was constructed in 2012, only some kilometers north of the Koedijkervlotbrug. After some problems the bridge was removed, repaired, and reinstated in 2013.

There are now five raft bridges, all of them north of the city center of Alkmaar:

- Koedijkervlotbrug
- Burgervlotbrug
- Sint Maartensvlotbrug
- Vlotbrug 't Zand
- Rekervlotbrug ('new')

== Operational history ==
=== The first works near Den Helder are opened ===
In August 1817 the commercial lock of Den Helder first became operational. On 4 November 1817 King William I and Prince Frederick arrived in Den Helder to see the lock. They also made a trip on a large boat that was towed along the new canal on the inside of the new Koegras dyke till they reached 't Zand, from whence they returned home.

=== The canal is opened ===
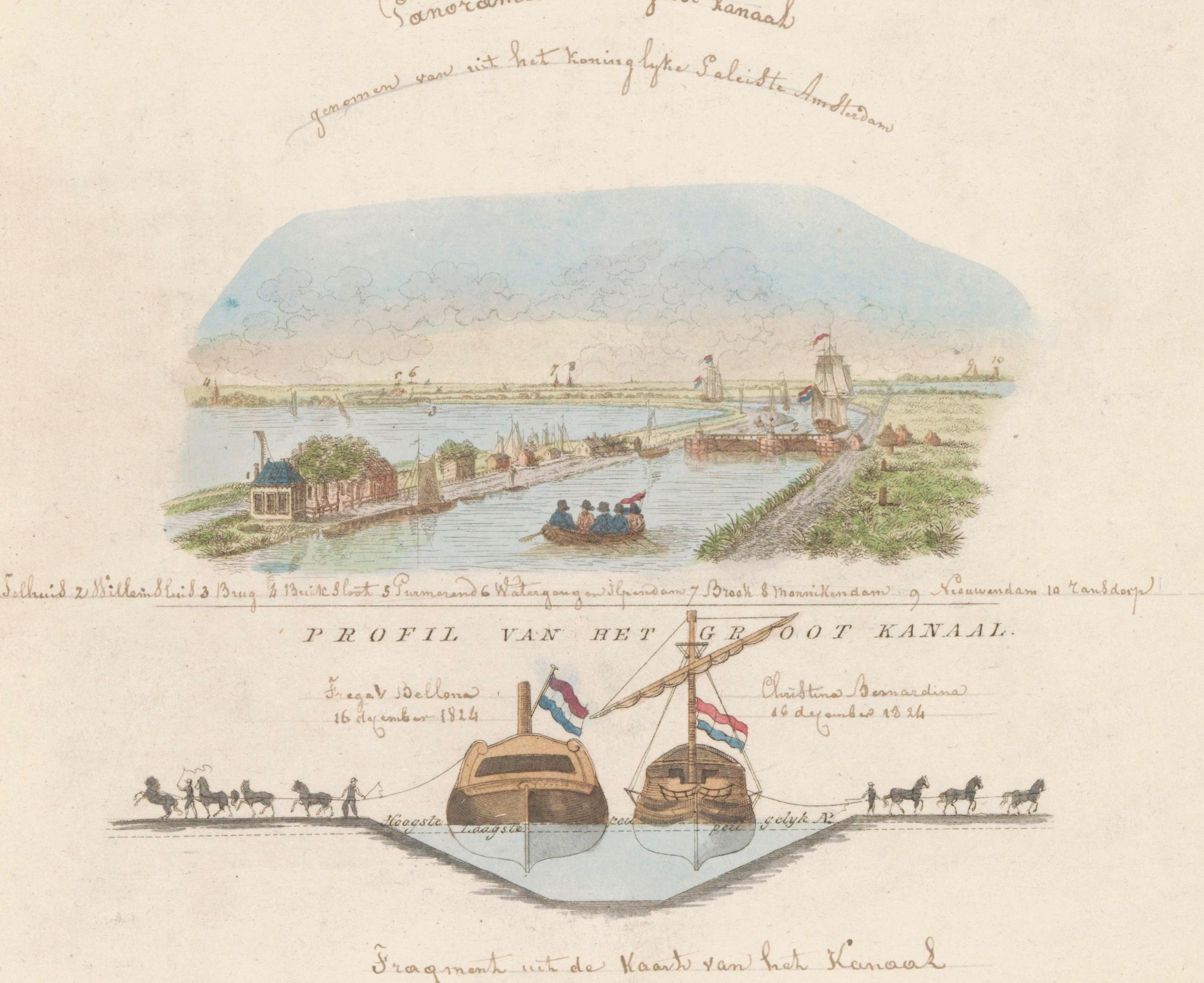
16 December 1824: Bellona passes Christina Bernardina

On 13 December 1824 the frigate HNLMS Bellona of 44 guns passed the Willem I Lock and entered the canal. She was commanded by Captain Roepel and had a temporary draft of 16 Amsterdam feet. She was to be drawn to Nieuwdiep by 12 horses, to be rigged and armed over there. Bellona arrived in Buiksloot after 25 minutes. On the 14th she was towed past Ilpendam at 10 am, and passed the Lock of Purmerend at noon. She passed Spijkerboor, and reached West-Graftdijk at 5 pm, where the frigate moored due to the extremely bad sight. On 15 December fierce winds delayed Bellona, but by the end of the day she had reached the Zeglis at Alkmaar. On 16 December Bellona passed through Alkmaar in the morning.

Meanwhile, the three-master Christina Bernardina of Captain H.H. Zijlstra, flag C.J.F. coming from Batavia, had arrived in Nieuwediep in early December. She had left Nieuwediep for Amsterdam on 15 December 1824, but got not further than 'De Kooi' by evening. On 16 December 1824 at four PM, the ships passes each other between the Sint Maarten and Schagen bridges. This was an event: there was music and Christina Bernardina saluted Bellona with 9 shots.

In the evening Bellona reached the Zijpe Lock at 't Zand. At 9 in the morning of the 17th Bellona passed Zijpe Lock. Near Kwelderbeek corner, a coastal vessel under full sail passed her from the opposite direction. At 5 PM she moored in the Koopvaarders Binnenhaven (Commercial inner harbor) of Nieuwediep, completing the first trip on the canal. On 29 December 1824 Christina Bernardina arrived in Amsterdam as first major commercial vessel using the canal. This was a two-week journey, which was not that surprising, because many facilities like towpaths were not yet ready.

=== First developments ===
Incoming ships in Amsterdam 1825–1850
Year	Number	Tons	From Dutch East Indies	Number passing Alkmaar
1825	1,606		12+	
1826	1,887 1,966	197,341	?	
1827	1,982 2,045	233,159		
1828	2,132			
1829	2,029		14+	475
1830	1,992			622
1831	1,624			
1832	2,246			
1833	2,374		c. 25	
1834	2,158		c. 50	798
1835	1,968		56	
1836	1,694		51	867
1837	1,974		56	1,002
1838	2,079		71	976
1839	2,357		98	1,215
1840	2,168	349,500	95	1,069
1841	2,031		107	
1842	2,158		95	
1843	2,043	349,454	102	
1844	2,204		117	
1845	2,433	367,451	110	
1846	2,812	415,588	122	
1847	2,754		116	
1848	1,937	339,594	115	
1849	1,908	363,623	121	
1850	1,960	345,100	108	

Up to 1 July 1825 about 200 sea-going ships used the canal, even though many things were not ready yet. In July 1826, for example, the construction of part of the towpaths along the canal still had to be ordered. This made it very difficult for ships to be moved along parts of the canal. Usage of the canal had also been adversely affected by drainage tests with the sea locks. Another problem was that a wet dock had not yet been built in Amsterdam. It meant that the ships that used the canal did not find a deep water port at the end of their journey. A commission was appointed to investigate what would have to be done.

In September 1826 two vessels were launched for J. Goedkoop and Comp. who founded a shipping line from Amsterdam to Nieuwediep and Willemsoord. One vessel was called Onderneming and measured 160 Dutch tons.

By July 1831 the dykes around the two wet docks of Amsterdam (Westerdok and Oosterdok) provided shelter to the ships using them. Oosterdok had also been brought to sufficient depth for sea-going ships to reach the Entrepotdok, where goods could be stored for transit without having to pay import taxes. The locks of the wet docks were not yet ready.

=== Traffic on the canal ===
Some numbers are available about the total number of sea going ships reaching Amsterdam. For the numbers of 1826–1850 it is tempting to assume that all loaded ships that came in used the canal, but this was by far not the case. The numbers of ships passing Alkmaar is at first only about a quarter of the number of ships reaching Amsterdam, later this increased to about half the number at Amsterdam in 1840. In 1852, this was still about half.

Specific numbers of incoming and outgoing ships on the canal, consistently show a significantly smaller number of outgoing ships. This is true for Alkmaar, but also for later numbers collected at specific locks. It suggests that on the return journey many empty, lightly loaded, and small enough ships, sailed the Zuiderzee, even if they had come in through the canal.

=== New lock at Nieuwediep and the 8-Ton Plan (1850–1858) ===
Incoming ships at some locks 1855–1856
Year	#Nieuwediep	#Purmerend	#Willem I lock
1848	972		
1849	1,067		
1852	1,057		819
1853	995		614
1854	998		799
1855	1,257		874
1856	1,363	955	976

Up till about 1850 all kinds of small improvements were made on the canal. Many of these centered on getting the desired bottom width of 10 m. Meanwhile, the size of ships increased, which was problematic for the locks. The locks were 65 m long and 15.70 m wide. At the time of construction this had been enough for any commercial ship. The Koopvaarders Lock (II 1823–1860) at Nieuwediep was only 53.30 m long and 14.10 m wide. However, this lock had an alternative route through the navy wet dock, albeit with its own limits and extra delays.

The first serious works to improve the canal were the construction of a new lock for merchant shipping at Nieuwediep, and the 8-Ton Plan. Construction of the new Koopvaarders Lock (III) lock at Nieuwediep was started in 1850. It was opened on 1 July 1857. The new lock was 69.60 m long, 16.93 m wide and deep 6.00 m below summer canal level, or 6.84 m below high tide. As regards locks, the new limits were then set by: the 15.70 m width of all other canal locks, the 65 m length of the Willem I and Purmerend locks, and the 5.40 m depth of Buiksloot Flood Gate.

The 8-Ton Plan was named after its budget. For 7 years, from 1852 to 1858, 113,000 guilders a year were to be spent on deepening the canal. It included making some shortcuts near Alkmaar and Ilpendam. This plan was indeed executed.

=== The canal becomes unsuitable ===
Since its construction, the basic problem of the canal was that shipping lines lost two days or more when their ships passed through. A problem that was even more serious because Amsterdam did not have much to offer as return shipment. The time for passage of the canal was increased by the many bridges, the lock gates and the curves and turns in the canal. At the time the canal also froze for extended periods in winter.

A 'new' problem was that the size of ships steadily increased. Even while the new lock at Nieuwediep and the 8-Ton Plan were getting executed, one knew that it would not be sufficient. A ship loaded deeper than 5,00 m would still have to partially unload at Nieuwediep, and in about 1850 the bigger sea-going ships reached a draft of 6.20 m when loaded. As a consequence, these sometimes had to unload more than half their cargo to use the canal.

=== Last Improvements (1856–1876) ===
On 27 July 1856 the government appointed a commission to investigate how the Noordhollandsch Canal could be made completely suitable to the needs of commerce and navy. One of the questions it had to answer, was how it could made suitable to service the largest type of commercial ship. The commission made proposals for much larger locks, a canal of 50 m wide at the surface and 6.75 m deep, removal of the inland locks etc. One of the recommendations of the commission was the construction of a new lock next tot the existing Willem I Lock. It would become 110 m long, 18.20 m wide and 7.33 m deep below Amsterdam Ordnance Datum and was finished on 15 December 1864.

Other recommendations of the commission were the construction of two shortcuts of 92,500 and 53,000 guilders near Koedijk in 1859 and 1860, and a shortcut near the Slochterbrug for 60,000 guilders in 1860. Furthermore, a lot of reinforcements were made on the shores, so steamers and steam tugboats could make better use of the canal. In 1864 the shortcut near the Texelse Poort in Alkmaar was made. The removal of the Purmerend lock would not be executed.

By 1860 there were 6 steam vessels pulling ships on the canal. In July 1866 Gebroeders Goedkoop started Schroef-Stoom Sleepdienst Noord Holland, that towed ships along the canal using propeller driven tugboats. This was a major plus, because moving a ship by tugboat was faster than towing it with horses.

=== The North Sea Canal ===
In January 1852 Amsterdam appointed a commission to investigate the construction of a canal from Amsterdam to the west, the later North Sea Canal, between Amsterdam and IJmuiden. It gave a positive advice in December 1852. Completed in 1876, the North Sea Canal made the Noordhollandsch Kanaal largely obsolete.

== The current Noordhollandsch Kanaal ==
The Noordhollandsch Kanaal is still used for commercial shipping. However, the canal's main functions today are recreation and water management.

== Gallery ==
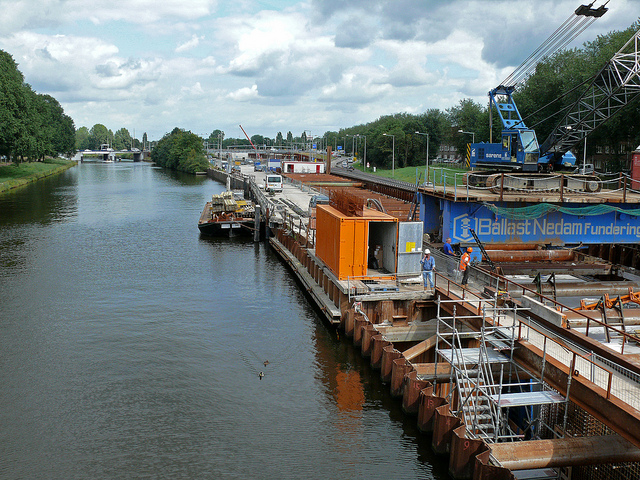
The canal along the metro tunnel construction site in Amsterdam

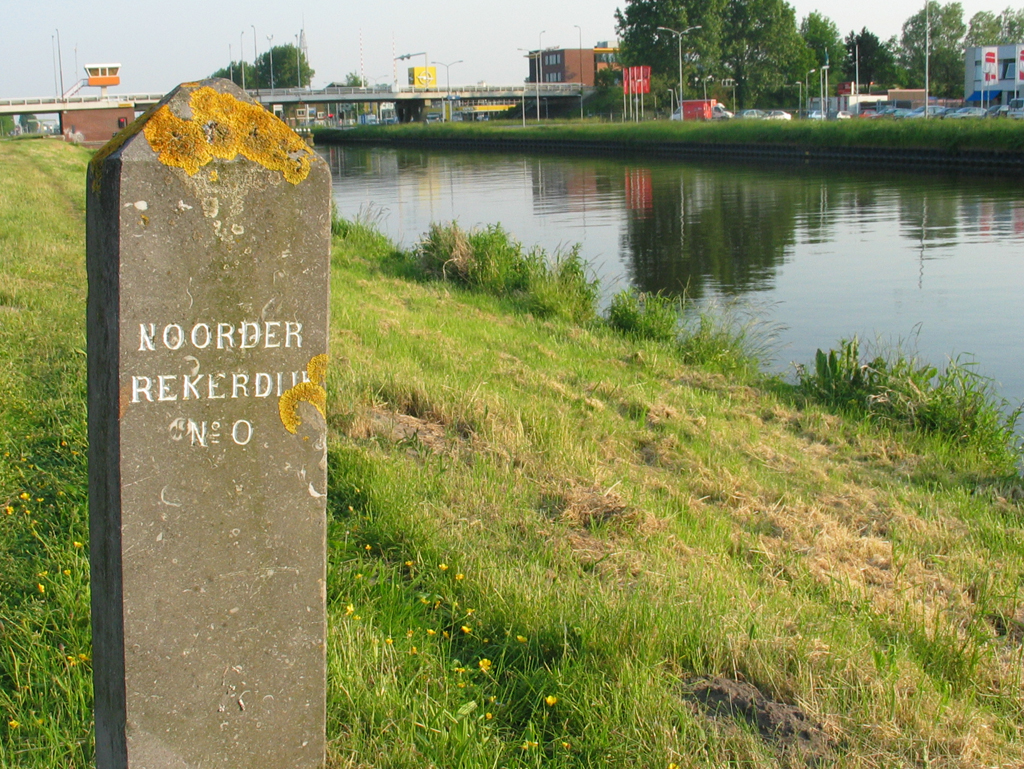
The canal near Alkmaar
