= Purchasing card =

Form of company charge card

A purchasing card (also abbreviated as PCard, P-Card, or ProCard) is a form of company charge card that allows goods and services to be procured without using a traditional purchasing process. In the UK, purchasing cards are usually referred to as procurement cards.

Purchasing cards are usually issued to employees who are expected to follow their organization's policies and procedures related to P-Card use, including reviewing and approving transactions according to a set schedule (at least once per month). The organization can implement a variety of controls for each P-Card; for example, a single-purchase dollar limit, a monthly limit, merchant category code (MCC) restrictions and so on. In addition, a cardholder's P-Card activity should be reviewed periodically by someone independent of the cardholder.

Regular reviews should be part of an organization's ongoing purchasing card program management efforts. A variety of factors can contribute to its success or, conversely, its stagnation. There are common P-card program pitfalls to avoid, with the goal of developing success strategies that can put (or keep) a program on the right path.

== History ==
Use of purchasing cards have seen a dramatic rise in recent years with many government organizations now using them to remove “red tape” and reduce costs. For example, In 2001 the Department of Defense (DOD) had 230,000 cardholders with an annual spend of $6.1 billion. Organizations typically use purchasing cards to target low-value goods and services, as it offers a mechanism to do these transactions at a significantly lower cost than traditional methods.

There are a variety of software solutions available to help manage purchasing card programs, in particular the electronic statements that are provided by card companies in place of traditional purchase invoices.

Organizations have started to use purchasing cards as a strategic form of payment in accounts payable (A/P), in addition to the traditional high-volume, low-dollar transactions. Organizations are replacing checks with purchasing cards and automating the payment to the supplier. This is one of the fastest-growing uses of purchasing cards. According to the 2005 Purchasing Card Benchmark Survey Results (Palmer and Gupta, 2007), traditional purchasing card transactions below $2,000 grew 1.4% from 2003 to 2005. The most dynamic growth was in transactions from $2,000 – $10,000 representing a 6.1% growth. A/P transactions fall within this range and can extend into the hundreds of thousands of dollars.

=== Statistics ===
According to the 2005 Purchasing Card Benchmark Survey (Palmer and Gupta, 2007):

- PCard spending increased from $80 billion in 2003 to $110 billion in 2005
- 43% of e-procurement transactions are paid via check
- By 2008 over 70% of all organizations will have a PCard program, up from 60% in 2005

The study goes on to discuss moving a purchasing card program to A/P. “The basic idea is to use the card to settle P.O.-driven transactions, like you would use ACH or check. The company captures the rebates associated with p-card transactions and sidesteps the work processing check payments involved. Although these cards currently are not in widespread use, their popularity is growing,”

Susan Avery (2005) states that according to the Aberdeen Group purchasing card benchmark report, best practice purchasing card programs “do not confine” purchasing to the traditional spending of low-dollar, high-transaction goods and services. These purchases include off-contract, non-traditional, non-purchase orders, ad hoc, and incidental purchasing. Best practice purchasing card programs expand the purchasing card to the AP department.

== Issues ==
One hurdle in the A/P PCard payment conversion is supplier enablement. This is often referred to as purchasing card supplier enablement or PCard supplier enablement. Every supplier must be contacted and informed of the payment change from check to the purchasing card, even if the supplier is already a purchasing card supplier. Some banks offer help in the conversion process (purchasing card supplier enablement) and other software companies provide technology to make the conversion efficient and easy for the financial institution, client, and supplier. According to a joint industry survey, “In terms of impeding an organization’s card program growth, 61% of end-user respondents reported that suppliers’ resistance to (or non-acceptance of) card payments is, at a minimum, somewhat of a problem. Not surprisingly, the transaction acceptance fee factor is overwhelmingly the number-one reason suppliers give end-users for resisting or not accepting card payments. Further, nearly 50% of respondents stated they sometimes or frequently encounter suppliers that impose a surcharge in conjunction with card acceptance. End-users employ varying approaches in response to the challenges; for example, educating suppliers on the benefits of card payments—a task that is often completed by program management and/or procurement staff."
