= Willem I Lock =

Dutch monumental waterlock

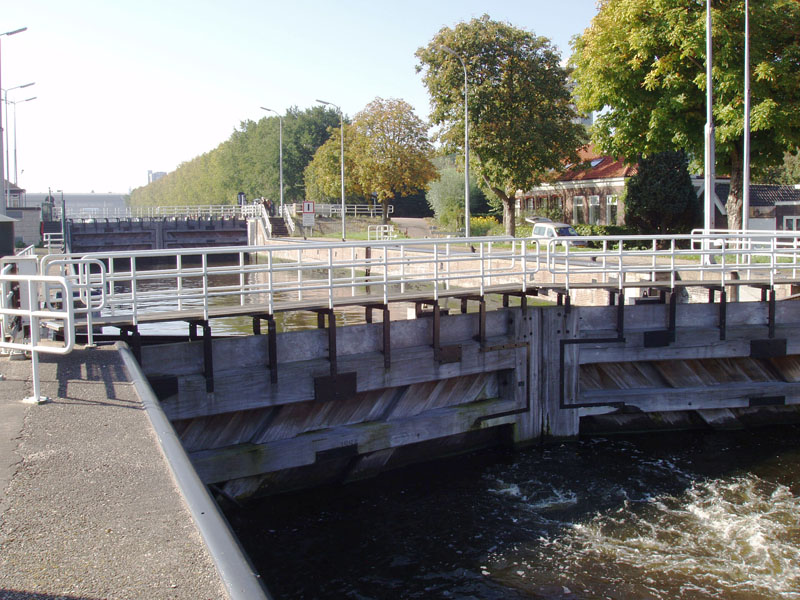
- Willem I lock, from the north.
- 52.383973°N 4.908131°E
- Waterway: Noordhollandsch Kanaal
- Country: Netherlands
- County: North Holland
- Maintained by: North Holland province
- First built: 13 December 1824
- Length: 56.86-65.41 m (1824); 65.08 m (1868)
- Width: 15.56 m (1824); 14.75 m (1868)
- Heritage status: national monument 525522

Willem I Lock is a monumental lock in Amsterdam-Noord.

== Location ==
Willem I Lock is just across the IJ from railway Station Amsterdam Centraal. The lock is on the IJ-end of the Noordhollandsch Kanaal, the other end is near Den Helder, where the Wadden Sea and North Sea meet. The location of Willem I lock is explained by the desire to place the IJ-end of the canal as close as possible to the Port of Amsterdam. For this it was built on the headland Volewijck, sticking out into the IJ.

== History ==
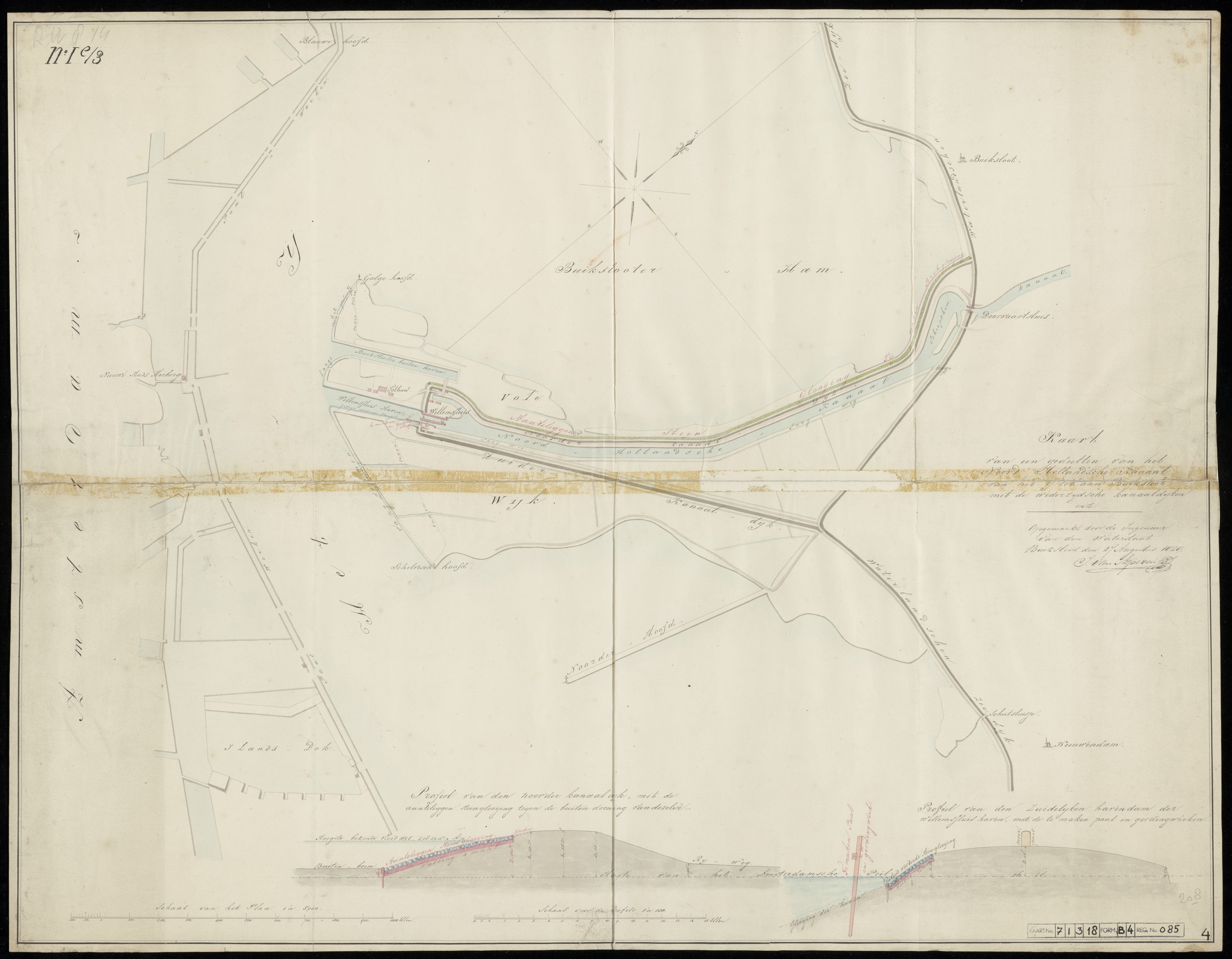
Volewijk Headland

=== First plan for a lock near the IJ ===
In late 1818 an inland waterway connection was established between Nieuwediep and Amsterdam. The complete connection could only be used by barges and small vessels that could lower their masts. However, the northernmost section could also be used by ships which could pass the (later) navy lock at Nieuwediep.

That same year, King William I asked Inspector General Jan Blanken for proposals that would enable ships to reach Alkmaar, and to pass it. The king also asked how ships could reach Amsterdam from there. Jan Blanken made several recommendations. One of the works that he proposed was a lock between Purmerend and Buiksloot near the Tolhuis at the Achterdigting. This lock was not constructed.

=== Ordering and construction of Willem I Lock ===
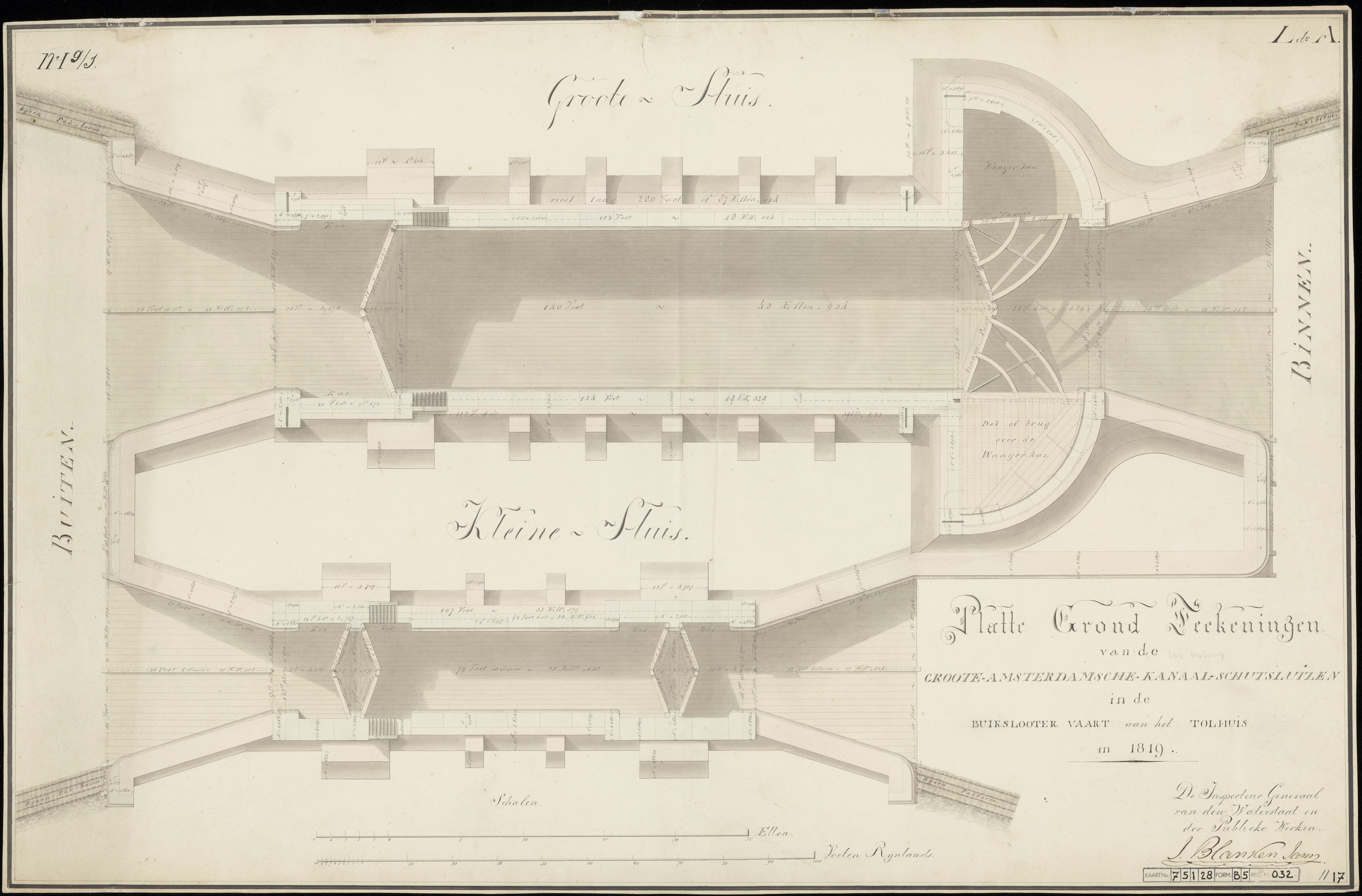
1819 design for a narrow lock by Jan Blanken

In 1819 the final plans for the Noordhollandsch Kanaal were made. The year started with the municipality of Amsterdam demanding locks of 40 Amsterdam feet wide for the canal. An Amsterdam foot is 0.2831 m. 40 Amsterdam feet is 11.324 m. An 1819 drawing by Jan Blanked indeed shows such a narrow lock, with fan gates on the large lock chamber. This narrow lock was not constructed.

In June 1819 the 'First proposal for the immediate construction of the Great Amsterdam Canal' proposed the immediate tender of a double lock near Tolhuis at the IJ, in July 1819. On 29 July 1819 the construction of a double lock near the Tolhuis was tendered at the same time as an identical lock at Purmerend. Somewhat later, on 5 May 1820 the works to dig the actual canal, mainly by expanding the Buikslotervaart and Purmerender Vaart were tendered. At the same time the construction of the Buiksloot Flood Gate, at Buiksloterdijk, was tendered.

Already in 1820 the lock was known as Willemssluis, or Willem Lock, after the king. On 19 July 1821 the king visited the locks. It was the first time that water was let into the chamber of the big lock. Near the lock was a tent with models of the locks and other works of the canal. This was the official opening of the lock, but it was not entirely finished. On 4 September 1822 the maintenance of the lock was tendered for 6 years, and in November 1823 the inside of the lock gates still had to be finished. On 13 December 1824 the frigate HNLMS Bellona entered Willem I Lock to commence the first trip on the completed Noordhollandsch Kanaal.

Soon Willem I Lock got facilities like a small harbor on the other side of the Tolhuis.

=== The passage of Steam Frigate Wassenaar ===
In late April 1857 the new, and therefore not fully loaded, steam frigate HNLMS Wassenaar arrived before Willem I Lock. She did not fit the lock. Therefore, Buiksloot Flood Gate was closed, and water let in from the IJ, making the stretch of the canal from there level with the IJ. The amount of salt water that entered the polder this way was quite considerable. On 2 May 1857 Wassenaar was pulled through.

On 3 May Wassenaar then used Purmerend Lock without any problem, even though the two locks were the same size. The explanation that was given, was that at Willem I Lock the water level decreases while the ship went through, while at Purmerend it increases. Which would make that at Willem I Lock the bow and stern of Wassenaar would hit the top of the lock gates. On the other hand, the extremities 'naturally' caused less trouble with the rising water at Purmerend. A possible different explanation is that at Willem I Lock the gates were much higher. At the IJ side these were 2.80 m above AOD, and that was again 1.1 m above Waterland level, so the set of gates at the IJ-side would be 4 m high behind Wassenaar, when she reached Waterland level. The Purmerend gates did not have to keep out the sea, and the lock itself bridged a difference of only 52 cm in summer.

=== Construction of Willem III Lock ===
On 27 July 1856 the government appointed a commission to investigate how the Noordhollandsch Kanaal could be made completely suitable to the needs of commerce and navy. One of the questions it had to answer, was how it could make the Noordhollandsch Kanaal suitable to service the largest type of commercial ship. One of the recommendations of the commission was the construction of a new lock next to (i.e. east of) the existing Willem I Lock.

This would become Willem III Lock of 110 m long, 18.20 m wide and 7.33 m deep below Amsterdam Ordnance Datum. Willem III Lock was ordered on 23 May 1861, and finished on 15 December 1864. It had two consecutive lock chambers of 65 m and 45 m. As long as nothing else was changed on the Noordhollandsch Kanaal, there would never be any need to regularly combine the two lock chambers. However, in case that the already underway North Sea Canal project would fail, the Willem III Lock would already be prepared to become part of a much bigger Noordhollandsch Kanaal.

=== Rebuilt of Willem I Lock (1864-1868) ===
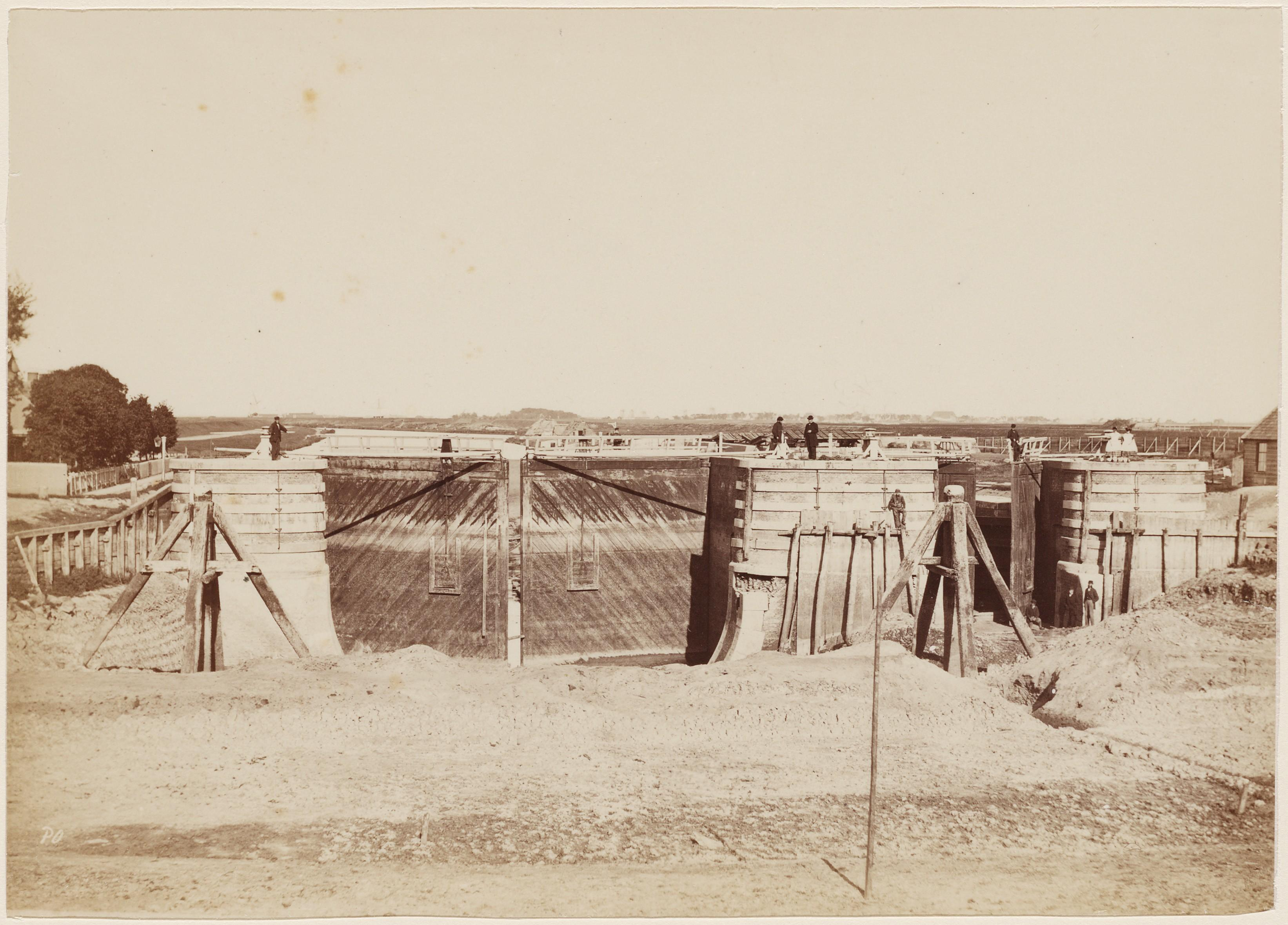
Rebuilt Sep. 1865

On 16 December 1864, only one day after Willem III Lock had been commissioned, Willem I Lock was decommissioned, and cut off by a dam, so it could be repaired. It soon proved that the damage to the lock was indeed as serious as had been deduced from the influx of salt water in the polder. The wooden floor had suffered so much from the shipworm that it was decided to replace it with a brick floor. The damage to the vertical brickwork was also extensive.

The extensive damage also makes clear why the extra Willem III Lock was built. According to J.F.W. Conrad, Willem III Lock had to be built, because the situation with the defective lock exposed the port of Amsterdam to the high risk of a sudden total blockade of shipping. The alternative was to repair the lock, but the defects were so serious, that repairs would also take an unacceptable amount of time.

On 25 June 1868 the small lock was reopened. On 12 December 1868 the large lock was reopened. Meanwhile, the names Schutsluis Willem I (Willem I Lock) and Schutsluis Willem III (Willem III Lock) were officially introduced on 6 October 1864.

== Characteristics ==
=== Double lock ===
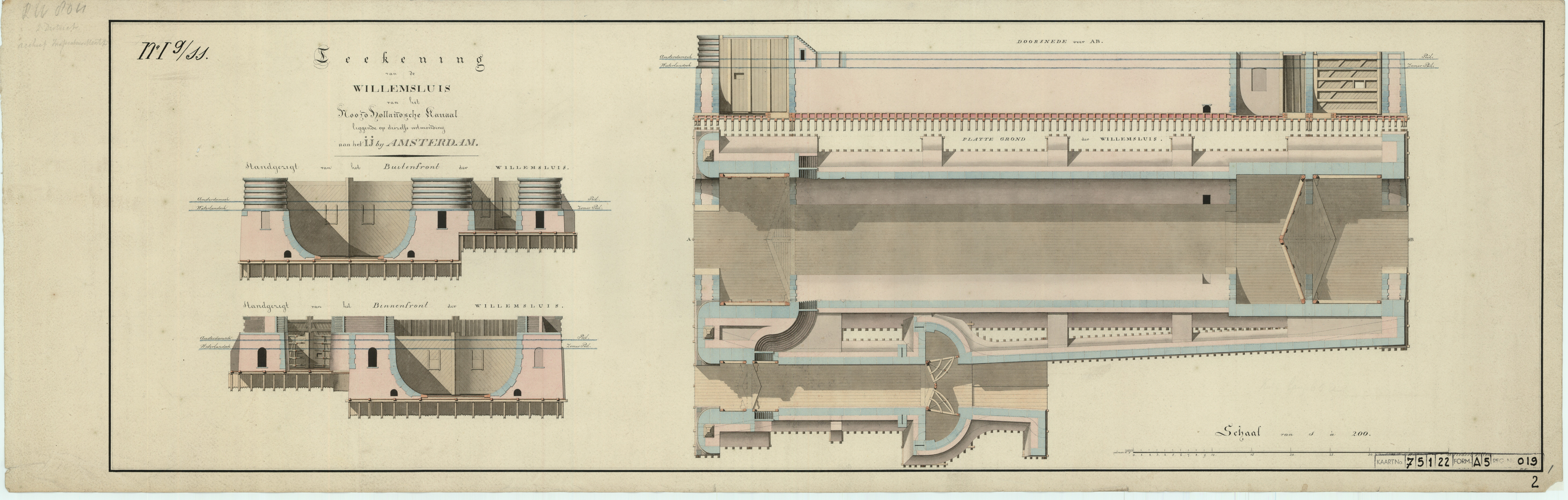
Pre 1826 drawing of the lock

Willem I lock was a double lock. Double locks are rather common to British canals, and are also found in North America. The main objective of 'doubling' is to increase speed, as well as to increase the chance that a ship finds a set of open lock gates. The peculiar aspect of Willem I locks is that it was a combination of a large lock next to a small lock. This was also true for other locks on the canal: Purmerend Lock and Koopvaarders Lock at Nieuwediep.

The locks on the canal faced a special challenge. The Noordhollandsch Kanaal was created by using existing waterways. Its locks had to serve a handful of big ocean-going ships a day, as well as a much larger amount of small boats that already used the waterways before they became part of the canal. For ships, the locks were not double, because they could only use the large lock. Smaller vessels could also use the large lock. However, this was very inefficient. Another aspect of using the locks was that at high tide, it led to the infiltration of salt water in the polders. It's therefore safe to assume that small vessels would seldom use the large lock.

=== Original dimensions (1824) ===
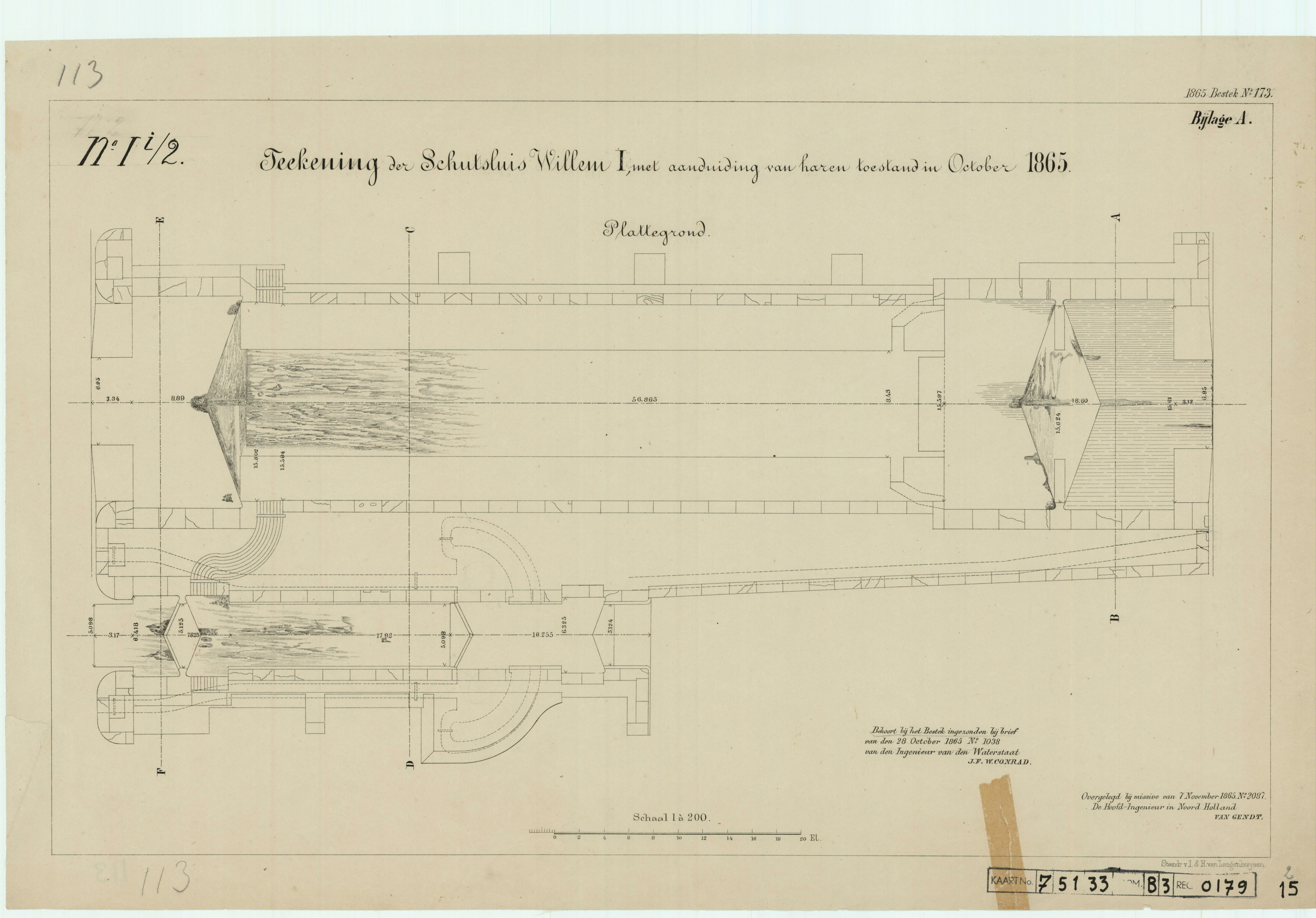
Floor plan of Willem I Lock in October 1865.

The 1824 dimensions of the big lock were: length of lock chamber 72.34 m, width 15.70 m, depth 6.83 m below Amsterdam Ordnance Datum and 5.73 m below Waterland summer level. The length of the lock chamber seems surprising, but it's not the usable length to which ships were able to use the lock. The same writer gives the length of both lock chambers at Purmerend as significantly shorter, i.e. 65.90 m for the large lock chamber. The explanation is in that Willem I lock had a third pair of gates that opened towards Waterland. These were only used when the ebb at the IJ was so (exceptionally) low that it was below the Waterland level. At Purmerend only one of the sets of outer gates opened towards the outside of the lock. Still the length of the lock chamber was a bit different than at Purmerend. In 1864, shortly before the rebuild, this was given as 65.41 m, together with a width of 15.56 m.

The useful length of the lock was smaller than the lock chamber length of 65.41 m, because one pair of gates swung inside. The area which was not at all bothered by gates opening to the inside was only 56.86 m long, see 1865 floor plan. The useful length of the lock was therefore between 56.86 m and 65.41 m and depended on the form of a vessel.

The 1824 dimensions of the small lock were: length of lock chamber 25.05 m, width 5.65 m, depth 3.45 m below Amsterdam Ordnance Datum and 2.35 m below Waterland summer level. The ebb gates of the small lock chamber were behind the gates on the IJ, and therefore did not make the lock chamber longer. On the Waterland side the small lock had fan gates, which can be opened against the high water. This gave the opportunity to drain higher grounds just like a sluice can do, i.e. so lower lying beds get deepened by creating an extra strong current. These fan gates later deteriorated, and were replaced by a set of gates on the outside, slightly lengthening the lock chamber.

=== 1868 Dimensions ===
After the rebuilt, the large lock measured 65.08 by 14.75 m with a depth of 6.50 m below AOD. With again three pairs of gates.

The small lock had been made much longer at 50.25 m. It was narrowed to 5.37 m and a depth of 3.25 m below AOD. After the renovation it had lost the fan gates, and had four pairs of normal gates.

== Willem I Lock today ==
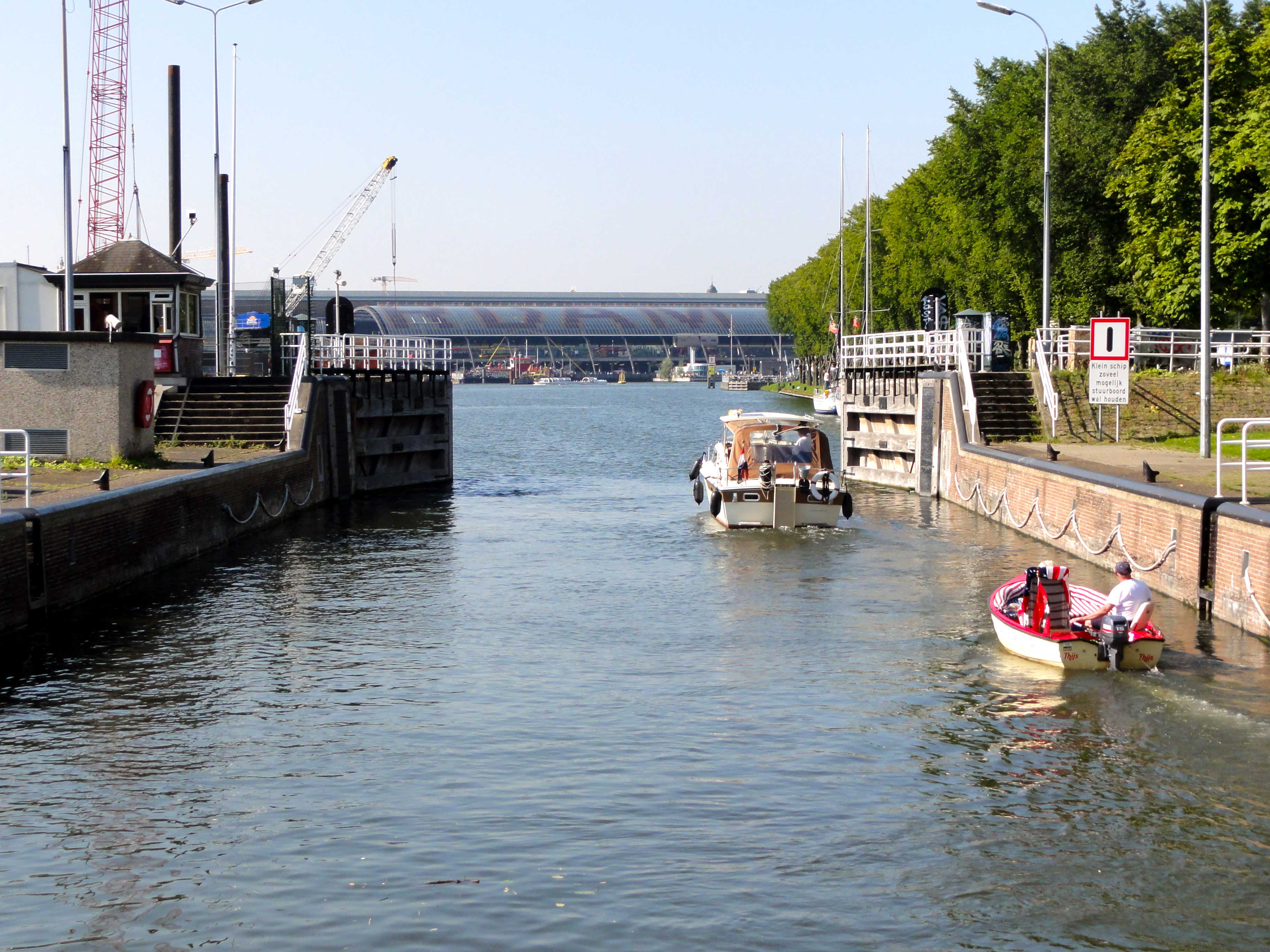
Recreational use

The later Willem III lock has been cut off from the canal, and no longer functions. In 1992 the small lock of Willem I lock was decommissioned. In 1995 the maintenance of Willem I lock was transferred to North Holland province.

The large lock chamber of Willem I Lock is now in use by commercial and recreational vessels. After the lock became a national monument, the province decided in 2009 to restore the small lock for recreational use and use in managing the water. Plans are underway to enable operation from a distance.
