= Koopvaarders Lock =

Canal locks in Den Helder, the Netherlands

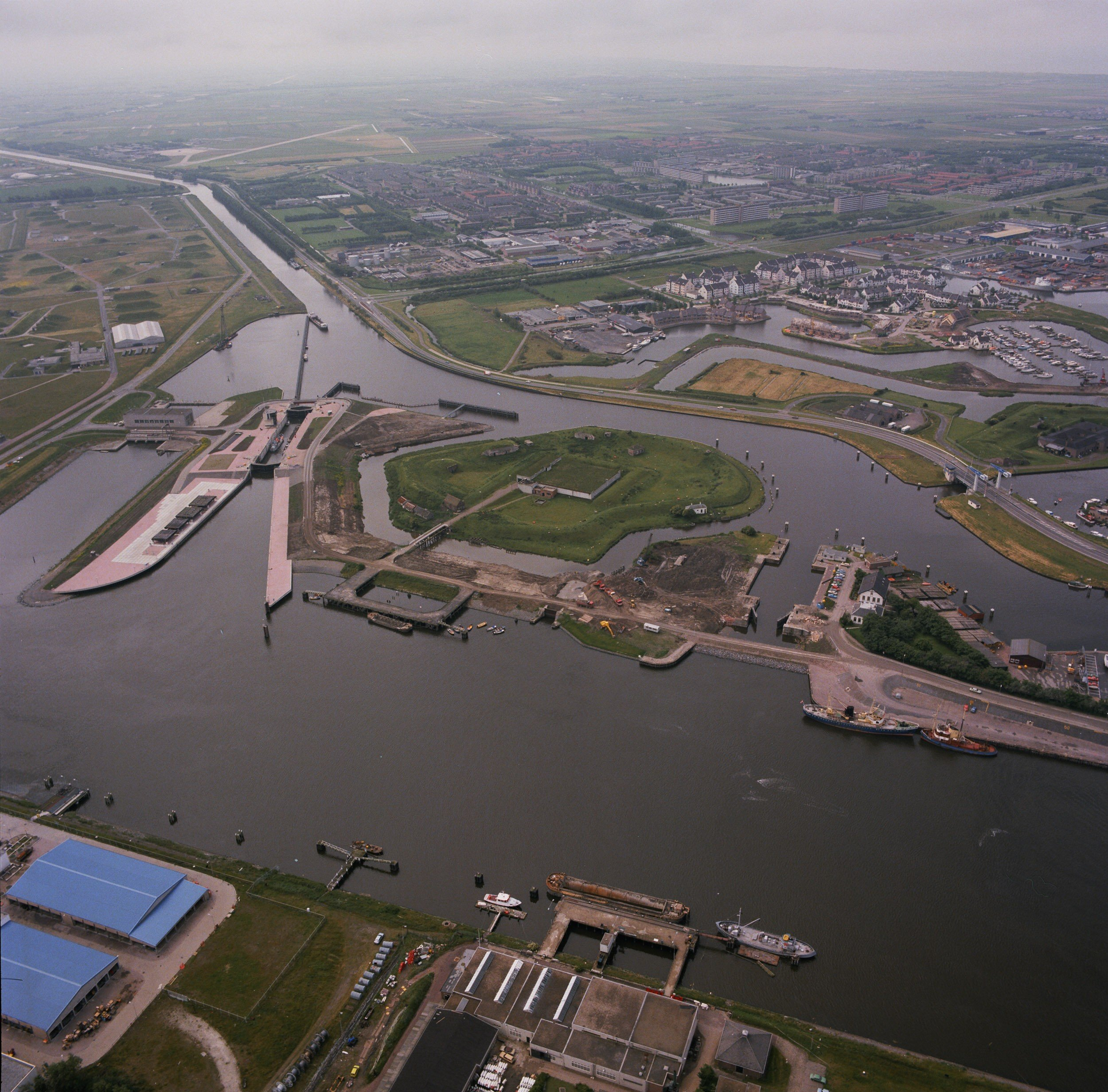
- Fourth (current), and third Koopvaarders Lock in 1985.
- Interactive map of Koopvaarders Lock
- 52.946903°N 4.787219°E
- Waterway: Noordhollandsch Kanaal
- Country: Netherlands
- County: North Holland
- Maintained by: North Holland province
- First built: 1824
- Length: 105-115 m (future); 85-92 m (current)
- Width: 15.95 m? (future); 15.95 m (current)

Koopvaarders Lock in Den Helder, Netherlands connects the Noordhollandsch Kanaal to the Nieuwediep. There were 4 locks at Nieuwediep carrying this name.

== Context ==
=== Nieuwediep is connected to Amsterdam ===
The Dutch Navy constructed the deep water harbor of Nieuwediep from 1781 to 1785. From 1792 onwards, a navy base was created. First at the Nieuwe Werk of 1792, which had its own lock, later at Willemsoord. After the Netherlands became independent again in 1813, King William I took a closer look into the commercial possibilities at Nieuwediep. By 1818 he had connected Nieuwediep to the system of inland waterways and ultimately Amsterdam. This was done by building a second lock at Nieuwediep, a canal, an inland lock at 't Zand and some other facilities.

=== The Navy Lock (Koopvaarders Lock I) ===
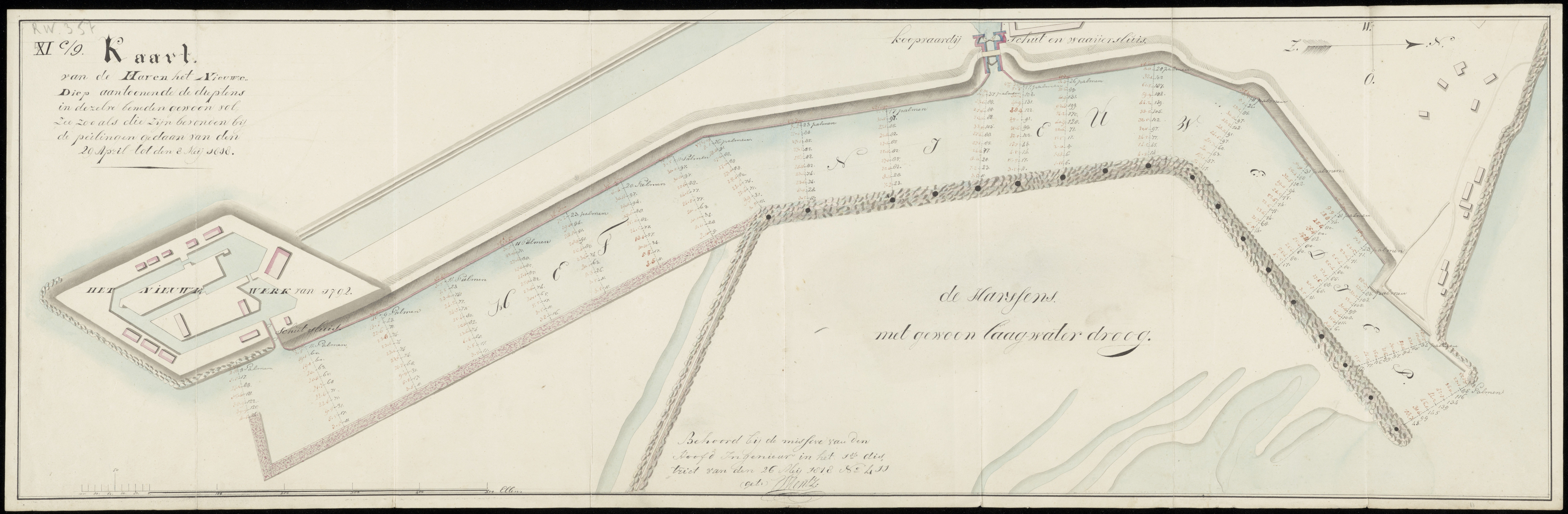
First Koopvaarders Lock, or Navy Lock in 1818

The first Koopvaarders Lock opened in October 1817. At first it had the same name as the Koopvaarders Lock treated in this article. It was called Koopvaardij Schut en Waaijersluis (Commercial Lock with fan gates), but also Koopvaarders Schutsluis. This choice of name was logical. It distinguished the lock from the navy Sea Dock Gate Zeedoksluis, which was under construction at the sea side of the Navy wet dock at Willemsoord.

The Navy Lock connected to the inner harbor called Koopvaarders Binnenhaven. The wet dock and the inner harbor were connected by the flood gate Boerenverdriet which had doors pointing towards the wet dock. Therefore, before the Koopvaarders Lock described in this article was built, there were four 'locks' at Nieuwediep: The Lock in the Nieuwe Werk, Koopvaarders Lock I (later known as Navy Lock), the Sea Dock Gate and Boerenverdriet Lock.

Koopvaarders Lock I would only carry the name for a few years. After Koopvaarders Lock II had been built for the Noordhollandsch Kanaal, Koopvaarders Lock I, and part of the inner harbor were transferred to the navy. Koopvaarders Lock I then became known as Navy Lock Marine Schutsluis, giving access to the maritime harbor.

== History ==
=== The Koopvaarders Lock II, III and IV ===
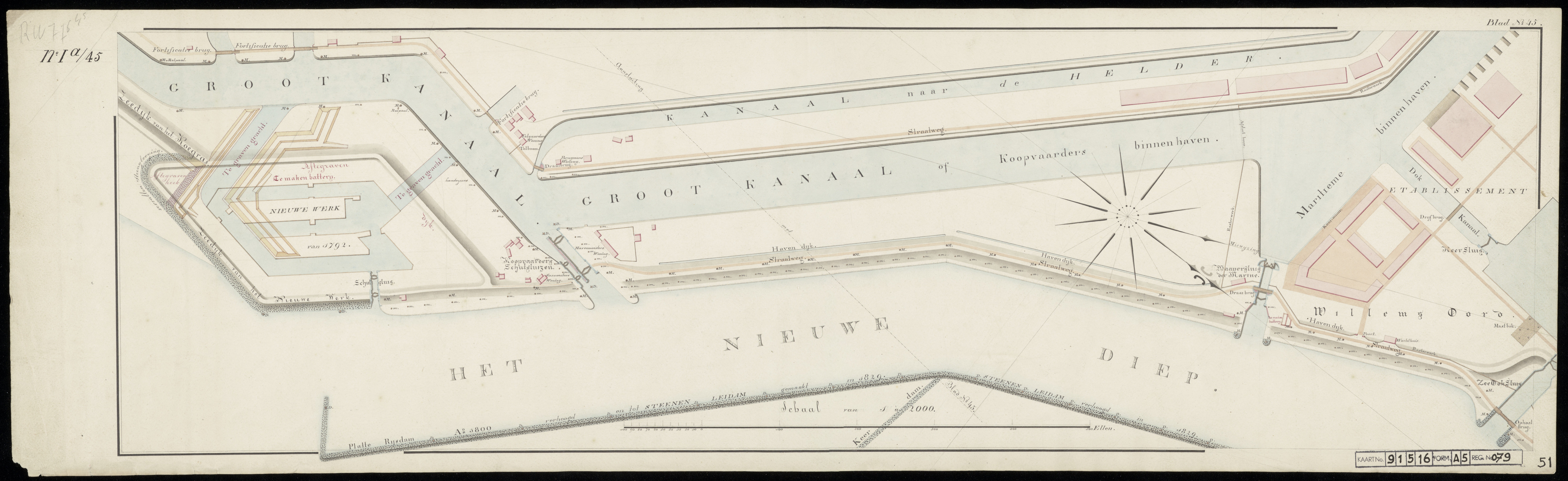
Koopvaarders Lock II with Nieuwe Werk

Koopvaarders Lock II was built in connection with the construction of the Noordhollandsch Kanaal. As such, it was constructed as close as possible to the entrance of the canal, i.e. just west of the Nieuwe Werk. The Nieuwe Werk would later be used to create Fort Oostoever. The creation of Fort Oostoever and Fort Westoever brought Koopvaarders Lock II within the fortification ring of Den Helder.

The second Koopvaarders Lock would be rebuilt twice. Each time at a slightly different location. However, each time it retained its name Koopvaarders Lock and function, i.e. to service commercial ships using the Noordhollandsch Kanaal.

=== The Noordhollandsch Kanaal is planned ===
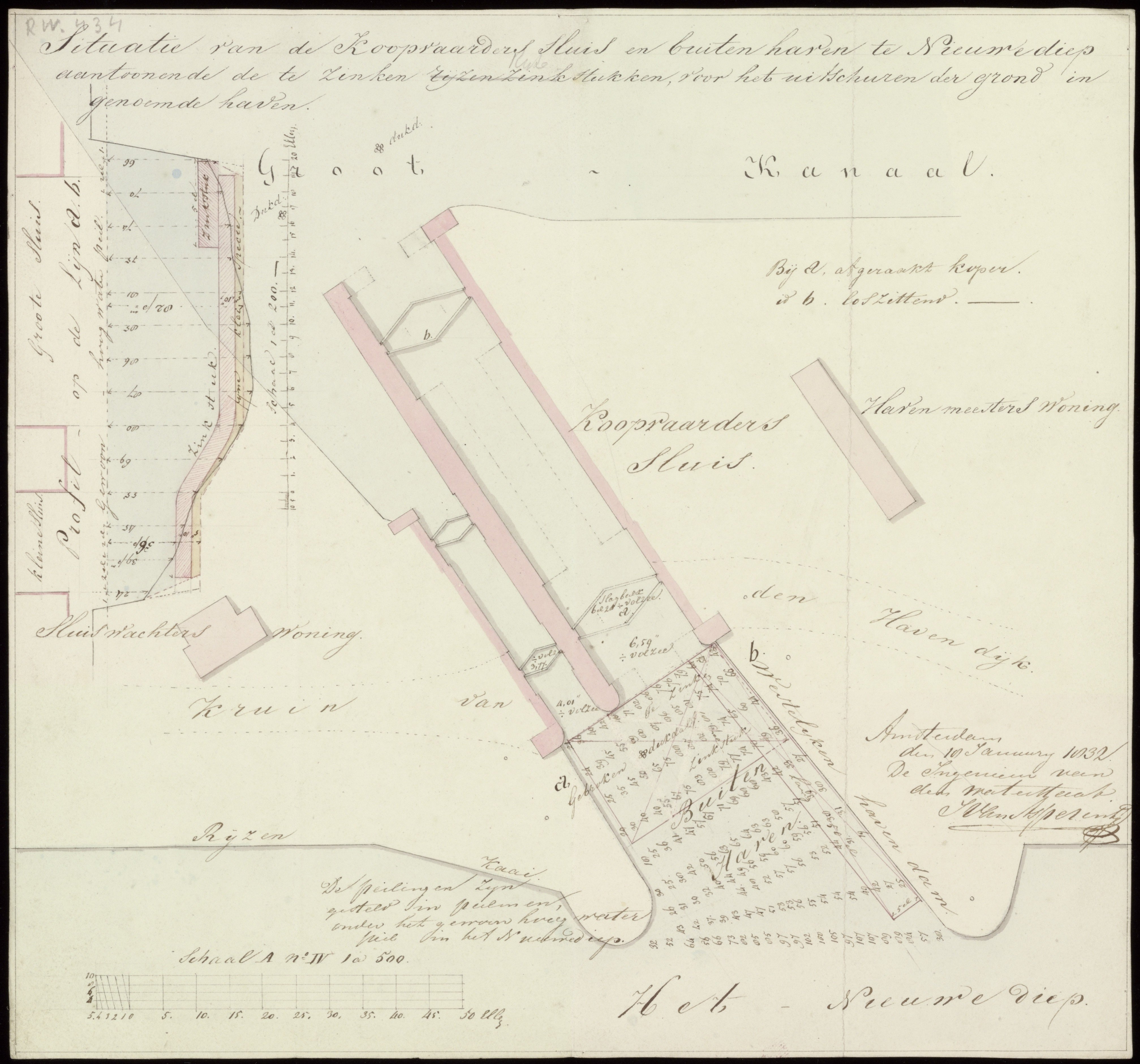
Map of Koopvaarders Lock II in 1832

In 1819 the final plans for the Noordhollandsch Kanaal were made. The year started with the municipality of Amsterdam stating its thoughts about the canal. The city council started by noting that the Navy Lock which had been built at Nieuwediep, was unsuitable for sea-going ships. It was only 33 Amsterdam feet (0.2831 m) wide, that is 9.34 m. That made it suitable for small vessels, but not for the frigates and brigs used at open sea. Even smaller ships of 160 lasts (1,976.4 kg) had a beam of 31 Amsterdam feet. To this beam 1.5–2 feet had to he added on each side for the external fixtures of the rigging, and so the Navy Lock was too narrow. Therefore the Municipality of Amsterdam demanded locks of 40 Amsterdam feet (11.324 m) wide. As regards draft it stated that a lock would require a depth of 15 Amsterdam feet on the gates, or 4.25 m below inland summer level.

However, once the plans for the canal were expanded to service ocean going ships, the plans were expanded further to accommodate warships. In the new plans all types of warships which were constructed at Rijkswerf Amsterdam had to be able to use the Noordhollandsch Kanaal to get to the navy base at Willemsoord. This requirement fixed the width of the new canal locks at somewhat above 15 m, so all warships except the first class ships of the line could use them. In all versions of the canal plans to service sea-going ships, the existing Koopvaarders Lock I (i.e. Navy Lock) was insufficient.

=== Koopvaarders Lock II (1823-1860) ===
On 10 May 1823 the construction of Koopvaarders Lock, 'with one or two lock chambers', was tendered. It's not clear exactly when it was finished. In December 1824 the Noordhollandsch Kanaal was opened, but it's not sure whether Koopvaarders Lock was used. First of all, Sea Dock Gate and Boerenverdriet Lock might have been used in the communicating with the canal. From the northern side the frigate Christina Bernardina from the East Indies opened the canal. However, she was only 159 lasts and had a beam of 27'8" Amsterdam measure. Therefore, she probably could have entered via Navy Lock. From the southern side, the canal was opened by frigate HNLMS Bellona, but it's not known when she entered the Nieuwediep. Apart from that, she too might have taken the route via the wet dock.

In July 1825 there was mention of constructing facilities on the canal near 'the newly built double lock on the Nieuwediep, near the Nieuwe Werk of 1792'. This could indeed literally mean that the lock had been constructed. It did not imply that it was operational. On 19 October 1825 the maintenance of the Koopvaarders Schutsluis was tendered, implying that it had quite recently been completed.

Koopvaarders Lock II would last less than 35 years, and this might have had to do with its condition in the 1850s. On 3 June 1858 the order to construct a dam on the sea side of Koopvaarders Lock II was tendered. There might have been ideas to repair Koopvaarders Lock II, but on 24 November 1859 it demolition was tendered. This tender was repeated on 30 December 1859, and then won by C. Dekker from Sliedrecht for 16,200 guilders.

=== Koopvaarders Lock III (1851-1985) ===
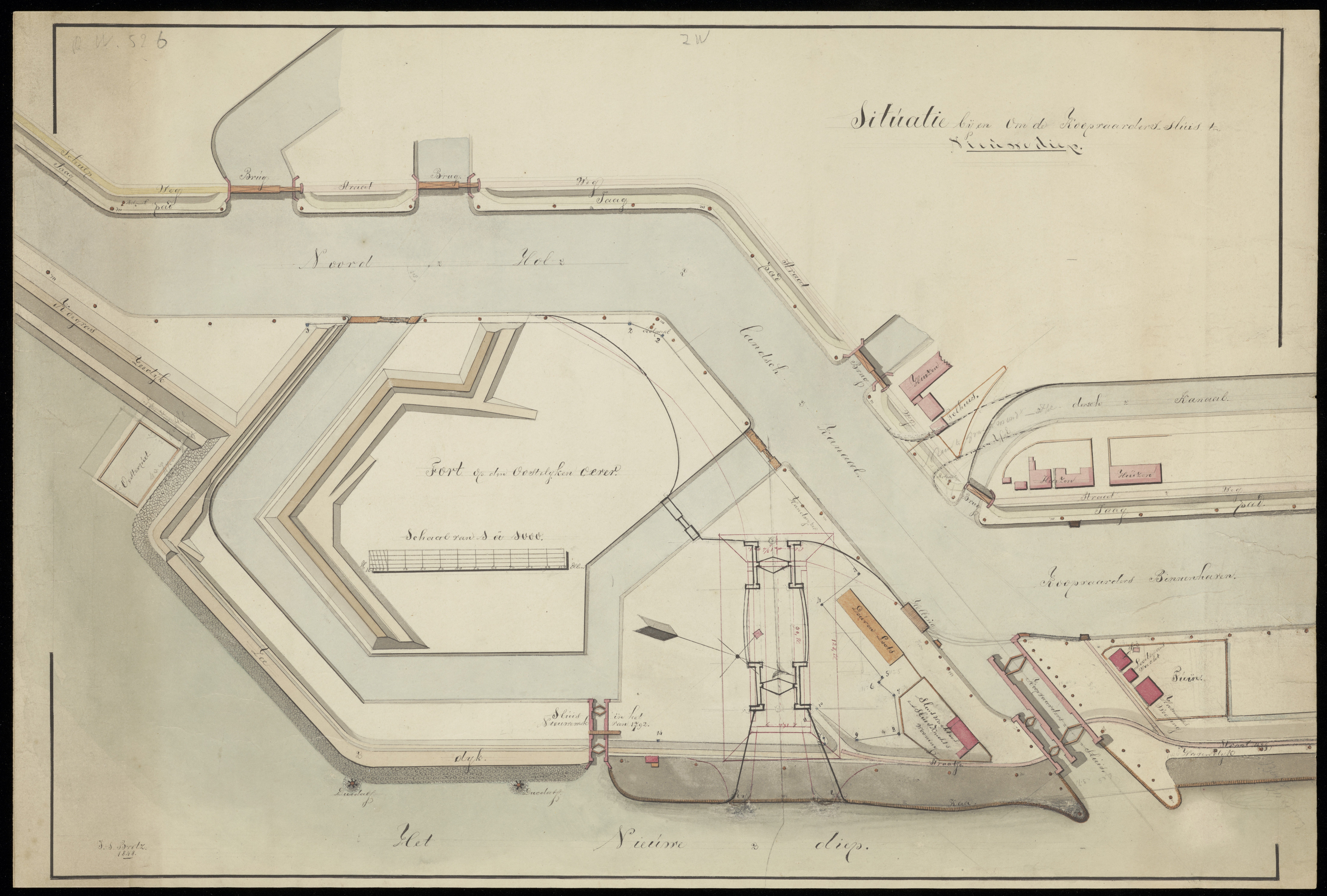
1848 drawing of location Koopvaarders Lock III

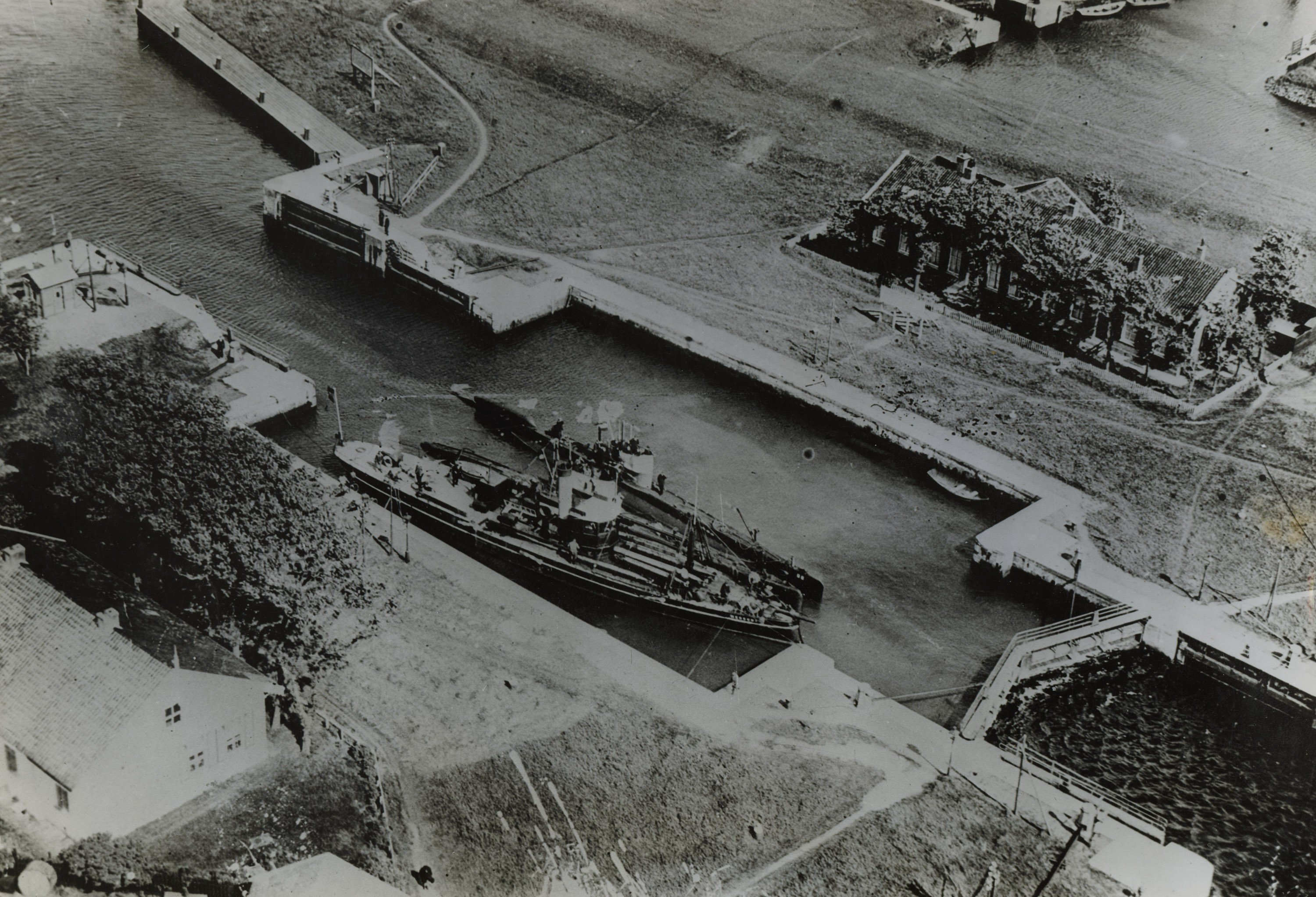
Koopvaarders Lock III with a glimpse of Nieuwe Werk Lock

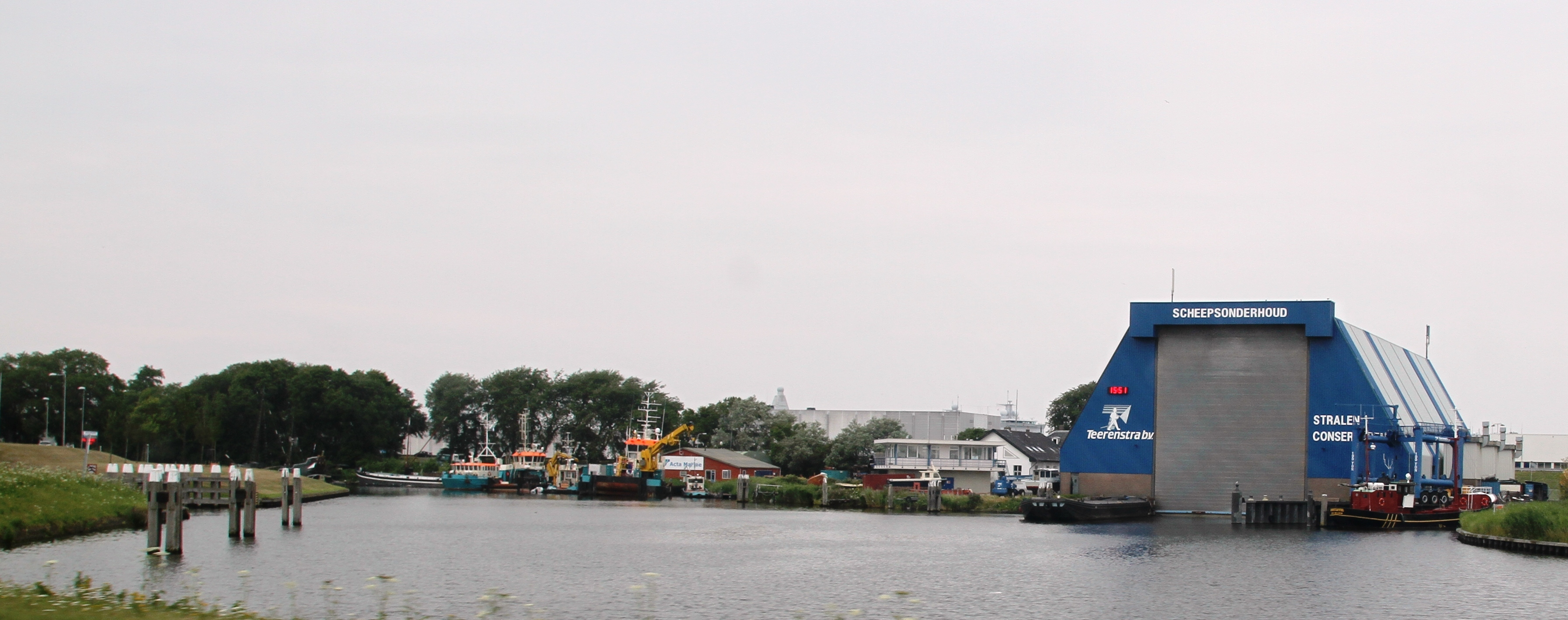
2015: Hall of Teerenstra on top of Koopvaarders Lock III

After Koopvaarders Lock II became operational in about 1825, commercial ships continued to increase in size. Soon ships became too wide, or could not pass Koopvaarders Lock II because they drew too much water. Of course merchantmen could also use the route via the wet dock and Boerenverdriet Flood Gate. However, daily use of this route was not recommended. It caused salt water infiltration in the polders, and lowered the water level in the wet dock, which should preferably be at high tide level. A lower level made that heavy warships hit the bottom of the wet dock, and prevented correct operation of Willemsoord Dry Dock I.

By the late 1840s Koopvaarders Lock II had many defects. Technically, it might have been possible to repair it, but economically this was not possible. Shipping to Amsterdam depended on Koopvaarders Lock II, and so it could not be decommissioned for lengthy repairs. Therefore, Koopvaarders Lock III was built slightly to the south, and a small bit of Fort Oostoever was chipped off.

On 23 July 1851 the construction of Koopvaarders Lock III was tendered. The contract was awarded to N. Swarte from Haarlem for 360,000 guilders. On 23 January 1853 the weather caused him to halt the works for a while. By 31 March 1853 the works had not been resumed due to a conflict between the contractor and the overseers. On 15 April the work was transferred to Mr. Sleben. On 12 June 1853 a steam engine started to pump the foundation pits dry. On the 13th a clean up was started, and the rest of the pile driving was expected to take place quickly. On 19 August 1853 the last of 1,678 piles was driven into the ground under the prospective lock. Just how important pile driving was with regard to the lock is shown by a state of day wages paid to several categories of laborers. Of all categories, the pile drivers worked the most, with 31,209 days. The masons e.g. worked for only 2,975 days.

On 26 May 1854 the first brick of the new lock was laid. Next 22 masons processed 5 million bricks in 24 weeks. In early November 1854 the brickwork was completed. At that time the planning was to next finish the lock gates in 1855. Excavation would take place in 1856, and commissioning in 1857. In May 1855 the plan was to lay 400 stone slabs to cover the brickwork in the summer. On 21 February 1856, the excavation ('connecting the lock to the canal and the Nieuwediep') was indeed tendered. Contractor G. Schalk from Buiksloot won the order for 128,900 guilders.

On 6 May 1857 the temporary buildings for the workers and stores were sold. On 30 July 1857 the maintenance of Koopvaarders Lock III was tendered. On 1 August 1857 Koopvaarders Lock III was opened.

In the 1970s the increased power of the ships on the canal steadily eroded the old lock. Stone fragments got loose, and often the bow propellers of modern vessels blew these between the gates and the floor, making that the gates got stuck. Apart from that, there were a number of collisions, and so the lock was regularly out of order in the seventies. For example when the American supply ship Springbuck collided with the lock gates on 31 October 1977. At that time the daily use of the lock amounted to 60-70 ships. Amongst these about 30 ships with sand (for construction in the province), and about 10 for the offshore industry.

After a new lock had been built, the lock chamber of Koopvaarders Lock III was closed on the sea side. The lock chamber was then taken into use by Teerenstra BV, which built a hall over it. The company then repurposed it to a location where it could effectively renew the paint layer of ships, while doing this in an environmentally safe manner.

=== Koopvaarders Lock IV, the current lock (1985-current) ===
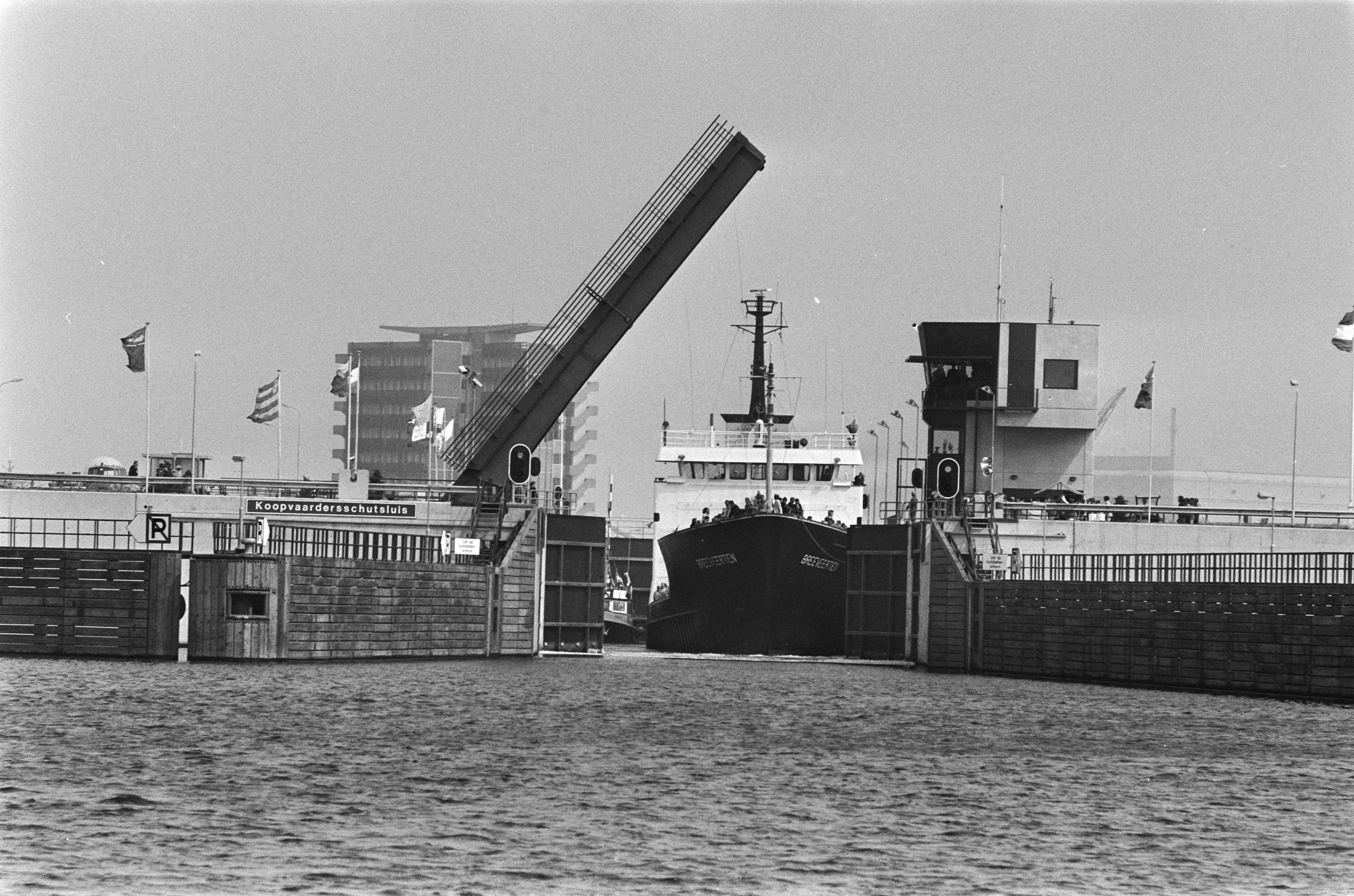
Opening of the current lock in 1985

By the early 1970s plan for a new Koopvaarders Lock (IV) were already underway. In 1976, construction was expected to start in 1978. However, by 1979 Rijkswaterstaat had only just begun making the plans for Koopvaarders Lock IV. In November 1981 the government recognized the urgency of building a new lock, but stated that financial problems prevented execution of the plans.

Nevertheless, construction got of the new lock was started in the early 1980s. On 8 May 1985 Koopvaarders Lock IV (the current lock) was opened. The cost was 55,000,000 guilders.

In 2015 an inspection found very large holes in the steel shoring of the lock. These holes were caused by bacteria. Soon the problems with bacteria causing corrosion proved even more serious than was first thought. In 2019 preventive repairs were executed, even though a rebuild of the lock had already been planned.

The rebuild of Koopvaarders Lock IV made that some themes resurfaced. Because of the time that the rebuild would take, the detour via the wet dock (see above) was to be used during the renovation. Now, the authorities decided to change Boerenverdriet Flood Gate to a regular lock, in order to lessen salt water infiltration. However, after the renovation Boerenverdriet was to be used by recreational vessels, and Koopvaarders Lock IV only for commercial shipping. This was a repeat of the double lock idea of 1825. Koopvaarders Lock IV would also be lengthened. This again caused concern for salt water infiltration. In 2020 the tender for the renovation of Koopvaarders Lock IV was placed together with changing Boerenverdriet Flood Gate to a regular lock. Closure was on 15 June 2020.

The 2020 plan aimed to lengthen Koopvaarders Lock IV from 85–93 m to 105–115 m length. This translated to a lengthening from CEMT IVa (RWS-klasse M6) to CEMT IVa (RWS-klasse M7), meaning ships of up to 105 m length would be able to use the renovated lock. In 2022, the idea to lengthen the lock was cancelled. The government of North Holland stated that it made no sense to lengthen the lock without a simultaneous upgrade of the Noordhollandsch Kanaal, which would cost a lot more. It also said that in 2024, there were only 420 commercial passages through the lock. In a slightly embarrassing turn of events, the province then had to admit that the real number of passages in 2024 had been about eight times higher. It could nevertheless claim that the average size of barges passing the lock was way less than the allowed length of 86 m.

The big challenge of the renovation, was that Koopvaarders Lock could not be closed for too long. Therefore, contractor Van Hattum en Blankevoort devised a method to reinforce the walls of the lock chamber without having to put it dry. This was done by drilling holes behind the walls and then injecting columns of grout into the ground under high pressure. In the end, these overlapped and formed a new lock chamber wall of 80 by 4 meter with a depth of 11 meter. The operation took some time because these new walls had to harden. In the end, the lock was only closed from 9 to 30 March 2026.

== Characteristics ==
=== Koopvaarders Lock II ===
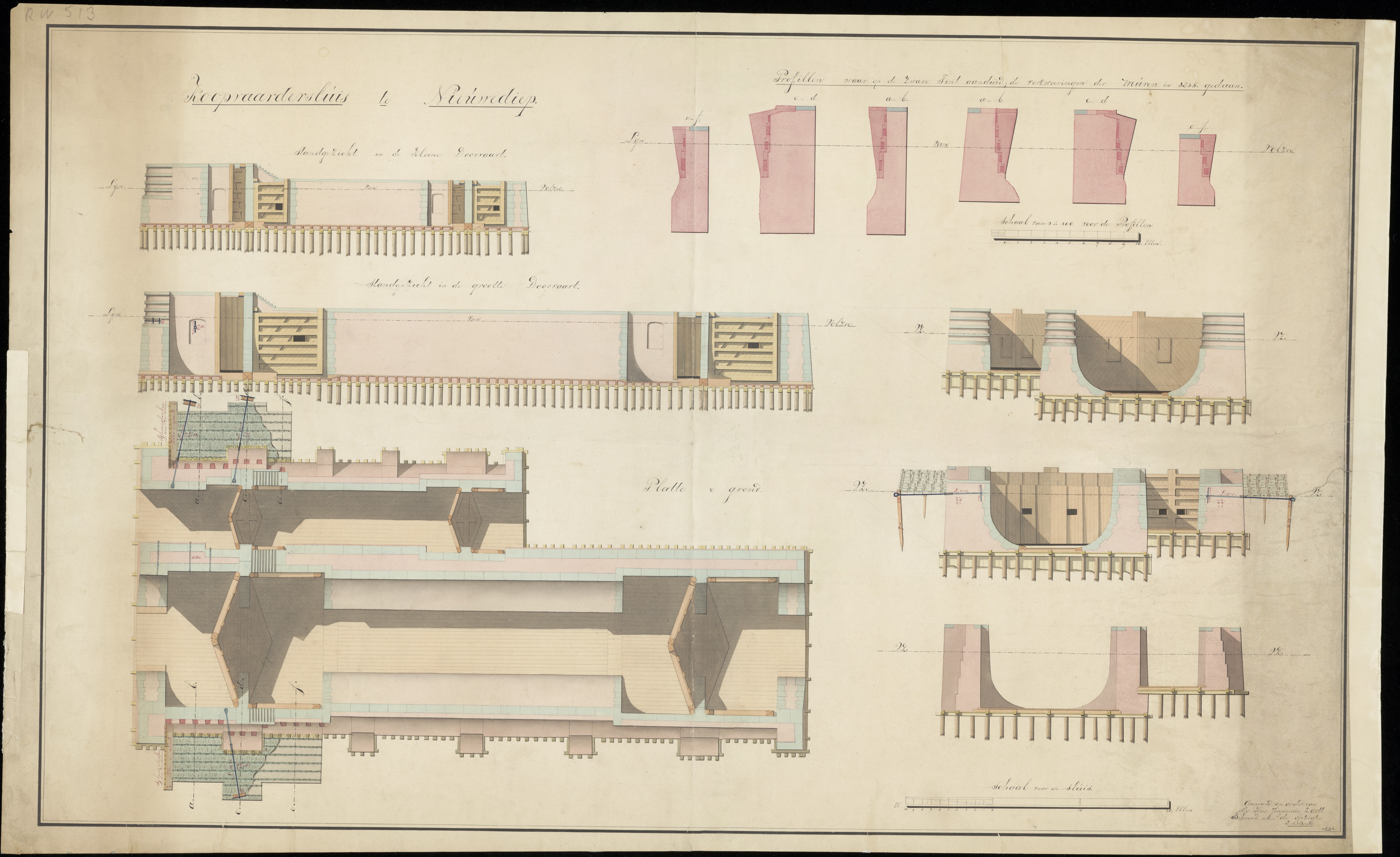
Koopvaarders Lock II design

Koopvaarders Lock II very much resembled Willem I Lock. Koopvaarders Lock II was a double lock, just like Willem I Lock and Purmerend Lock. Most double locks have two lock chambers of the same size, because their primary goal is to speed up passage. The locks on the Noordhollandsch Kanaal faced a different challenge. They had to serve a few sea-goings ships each day, as well as a much larger of smaller vessels. Therefore, it was more efficient to have a designated lock for these smaller vessels.

Koopvaarders Lock II was significantly larger than Koopvaarders Lock I, but still smaller than Willem I Lock and Purmerend Lock. This seems mysterious, but was based on the calculation that the extreme width of Willem I Lock and Purmerend Lock was only necessary for warships. For the few times that a heavy warship would use the canal, there was an alternative at Nieuwediep. To reach the Nieuwediep, they could use the inland flood gate Boerenverdriet, and the Navy Dock Flood Gate.

The name Koopvaarders Sluis has been explained by stating that only merchantmen used this lock, and navy ships had an alternative. However, this explanation might have been created after Koopvaarders Lock II had been built.

=== Koopvaarders Lock III ===
Koopvaarders Lock III had only a single lock chamber. The reason for this deviation from the plan of the previous lock is simple. Even before the construction of Koopvaarders Lock III, Nieuwe Werk Lock had been designated for servicing small vessels. At the time that Koopvaarders Lock III was constructed, there was also hope that Koopvaarders Lock II would be repaired, and could therefore also serve smaller vessels.

In 1856, even before Koopvaarders Lock III was finished there was criticism about the lock. Of the 1,257 ships that entered Nieuwediep in 1855, 47 had a loaded draft of 5.9 m or more, and would still have had to partially unload, had the new lock been ready that year. At that time the plan for Willem III Lock on the IJ of 110 by 18 m had already been made.

=== Koopvaarders Lock IV ===
Koopvaarders Lock IV is longer than its predecessor, but also faster. The time to lift a ship was reduced from 15+ minutes to 7 minutes.

=== Dimensions ===
The big lock of Koopvaarders Lock II was 53.35 m long, 14.13 m wide, and deep 6.07 m below AOD, or 6.28 m below high tide at Nieuwediep and 5.49 m below inland level. The small lock of Koopvaarders Lock II was 25.12 m long, 6.28 m wide, and deep 3.56 m below AOD, or 3.77 m below high tide at Nieuwediep and 2.98 m below inland level.

The dimensions of Koopvaarders Lock III were: 65 m long, 17 m wide, and deep 6.71 m below high tide, or 6.50 m below AOD, or 5.92 m below inland level. More specific data about the lock chamber was: width in the center 33 m; length between the gates 71 m; length of the lock chamber 43 m.

Koopvaarders Lock IV is 86 m long, 10 m more than its predecessor.
