= TradeCard =

American supply chain software company

TradeCard, Inc.
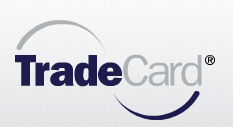
- Type: Private
- Industry: Software, Information Technology
- Founded: 1999
- Founder: Kurt Cavano
- Defunct: 2013
- Headquarters: New York City, United States
- Area served: Global
- Key people: Sean Feeney; (Chief Executive Officer); Kurt Cavano; (Founder, Chairman, and Chief Strategy Officer); Guy Rey-Herme; (President and Chief Operating Officer)
- Products: supply chain management software
- Services: procure to pay, trade finance, work in process tracking, pack and scan, shipment building, purchase order collaboration
- Owner: Warburg Pincus
- Number of employees: 400
- Website: www.tradecard.com

TradeCard, Inc. was an American software company. Its main product, also called TradeCard, was a SaaS collaboration product that was designed to allow companies to manage their extended supply chains including tracking movement of goods and payments. TradeCard software helped to improve visibility, cash flow and margins for over 10,000 retailers and brands, factories and suppliers, and service providers (financial institutions, logistics service providers, customs brokers and agents) operating in 78 countries.

On January 7, 2013, TradeCard and GT Nexus announced plans to undergo a merger of equals, creating a global supply-chain management company that would employ about 1,000 people and serve about 20,000 businesses in industries including manufacturing, retail and pharmaceuticals. The combined company rebranded itself as GT Nexus.

== History ==
TradeCard was founded in 1999 by Kurt Cavano as a privately owned firm.

In 2003, Warburg Pincus led three funding rounds, with TradeCard closing $10 million.

In 2010, Deloitte cited TradeCard for its entrepreneurial and disruptive cloud technology enterprise resource planning solution that provides new IT architectures designed to address unmet needs of enterprises.

In 2011, TradeCard's revenue grew by 36% over the previous year, and the company claimed on its website that it handled $25 billion in sourcing volume on its platform, by 10,000 organizations and 45,000 unique users. In 2012, founder and CEO Kurt Cavano transitioned to the Chairman role and Sean Feeney was appointed CEO.

TradeCard was headquartered in New York City, with offices in San Francisco, Amsterdam, Hong Kong, Shenzhen, Shanghai, Taipei, Seoul, Colombo and Ho Chi Minh City.

== Clients ==
TradeCard provided global supply chain and financial supply chain products to retail companies, factories and suppliers, and service providers (financial institutions, logistics service providers, customs brokers and agents).

Clients include retailers and brands such as Coach, Inc. Levi Strauss & Co., Columbia Sportswear, Guess, Rite Aid, and Perry Ellis International.

== Awards ==
- 2012 Best Platform Connecting Buyers, Suppliers and Financial Institutions by Global Finance
- 2012 Supply and Demand Chain 100
- 2012 Pros to Know by Supply and Demand Chain
- 2011 Top Innovator by Apparel Magazine
- 2011 Great Supply Chain Partner by SupplyChainBrain
