= GT Nexus =

American logistics software company

Infor Nexus
- Type: Private
- Industry: Supply-chain management Global trade automation Enterprise software
- Founded: 1998
- Founder: Aaron Sasson; John Urban; Greg Johnsen; Anil Nair
- Headquarters: Oakland, California, United States
- Area served: America; Europe; Asia
- Products: Supply Chain Visibility; Supply Chain Intelligence; Factory Management; Transportation Management; Inventory Management; Supply Collaboration; Procure to Pay; Supply Chain Finance; App Xpress; Logistics
- Owner: Infor
- Website: www.infor.com

Infor Nexus (formerly known as GT Nexus) is an independent business unit of Infor LLC offering a multienterprise supply chain network. The on-demand global supply chain management platform and integrated applications are used worldwide by businesses to manage global direct procurement, supplier networks, global logistics and global trade processes. Founded in 1998, in Oakland, California, it merged with TradeCard in 2013, and in September 2015, GT Nexus was acquired by Infor. Today, Infor Nexus is a business unit of Infor.

Infor Nexus operates in the Americas, Europe, and Asia with a focus on retail/apparel and industrial manufacturing. Customers include companies in pharmaceuticals, high-tech, automotive, CPG, apparel and footwear. Logistics service providers, financial service providers, and suppliers are also part of the Infor Nexus network. Its customers include Brooks Brothers, Sears, Adidas, Procter & Gamble, Del Monte Foods, Caterpillar Inc., Koch Industries, Abercrombie & Fitch, and Home Depot.

== History ==
GT Nexus was founded as Tradiant in Alameda, California 1998. The company was renamed as GT Nexus in 2001.

In 2008, the company acquired Metaship, a provider of logistics management technology.

In 2013, the company merged with TradeCard. The joint company employed about 1,000 people, and served about 20,000 businesses in manufacturing, retail, and logistics.

In 2014, they acquired Clear Abacus, a cloud-based solution that optimizes multimodal transportation planning. A year later, GT Nexus was acquired by Infor, a technology company delivering industry-specific cloud suites. The deal, valued at $675 million, closed on September 21, 2015.

In 2018, GT Nexus launched a new global trade management platform. A year later, the company relaunched as Infor Nexus.

== See also ==
- Shipping portal
- Supply-chain management
- Supply chain management software
- Supply chain network
- Transportation management system
- Vendor relationship management
