= Shipping portal =

Shipping portals are websites which allow shippers, consignees and forwarders access to multiple carriers through a single site. Portals provide bookings, track and trace, and documentation, and allow users to communicate with their carriers. In many respects, a shipping portal is to the maritime industry what a global distribution system (GDS) is to the airline industry.

== History ==
Shipping portals first emerged in 2000-2001 when CargoSmart, GT Nexus and INTTRA Inc. all launched their trial phases.

== Portal members ==
Membership across the three main shipping portals comprises 30 carriers of varying sizes, but the majority are amongst the world's largest, so most of the industry's TEU capacity is represented.

Carrier	TEU	CargoSmart	GT Nexus	INTTRA Inc.
Maersk / Safmarine / MCC Transport Singapore	2,005,000	check	check	check
Mediterranean Shipping Company (MSC)	1,521,000	check	check	check
CMA CGM / Australian National Line (ANL)	976,000	check	check	check
China Ocean Shipping Company (COSCO)	497,000	check	check	check
Hapag-Lloyd	488,000	check	check	check
American President Lines (APL)	470,000		check	check
China Shipping Container Lines (CSCL)	455,000	check	check	check
Nippon Yusen Kaisha (NYK)	420,000	check	check	check
Hanjin / Senator Line	382,000	check	check	check
Mitsui O.S.K. Lines (MOL)	380,000	check	check	check
Orient Overseas Container Line (OOCL)	356,000	check	check	
Hamburg Süd / Aliança	318,000		check	check
K Line	316,000	check	check	check
Yang Ming Line	311,000	check	check	check
CSAV / Libra	299,000		check	check
Zim Line	277,000	check	check	check
Hyundai Merchant Marine (HMM)	265,000	check	check	check
United Arab Shipping Company (UASC)	150,000		check	check
Wan Hai Lines	123,000	check	check	check
Emirates Shipping Line	25,000			check
Crowley Maritime	19,000		check	
Deutsche Afrika-Linien (DAL)	11,000			check

== Sailing schedule search engines ==
No portals can access all shipping lines. With around 250 container shipping lines world-wide, many carriers are left out. Sailing schedule search engines have emerged to allow users to find an appropriate service.

== See also ==
- Container terminal
- Containerization
- Intermodal container
- List of busiest container ports
- List of ship companies
- Merchant vessel
- List of container shipping companies by ship fleets and containers
