= Shipping line =

Business that transports cargo aboard ships

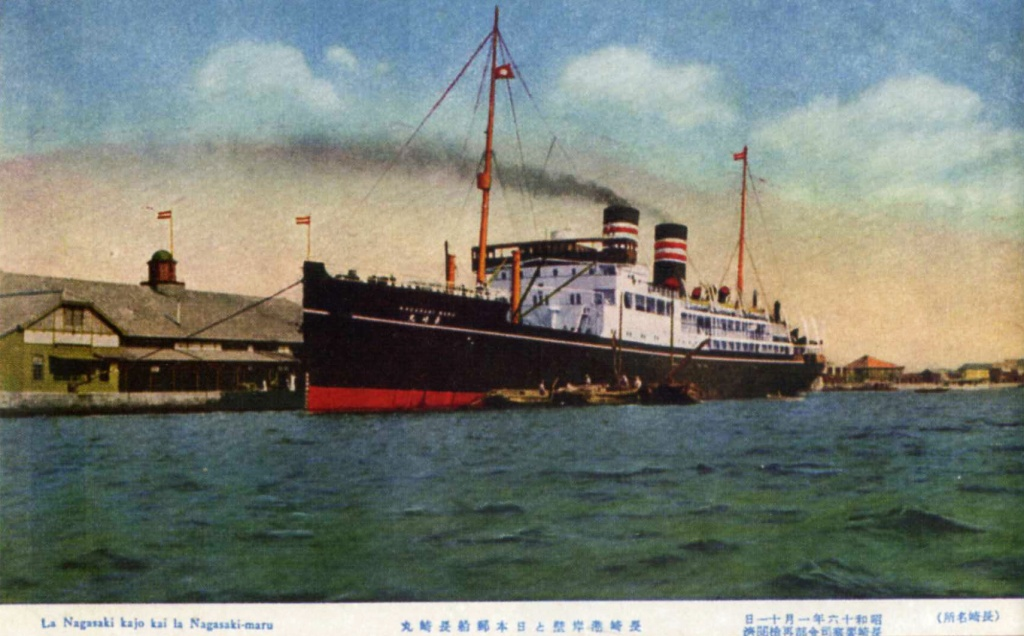
Nippon Yusen Kaisha Shipping line

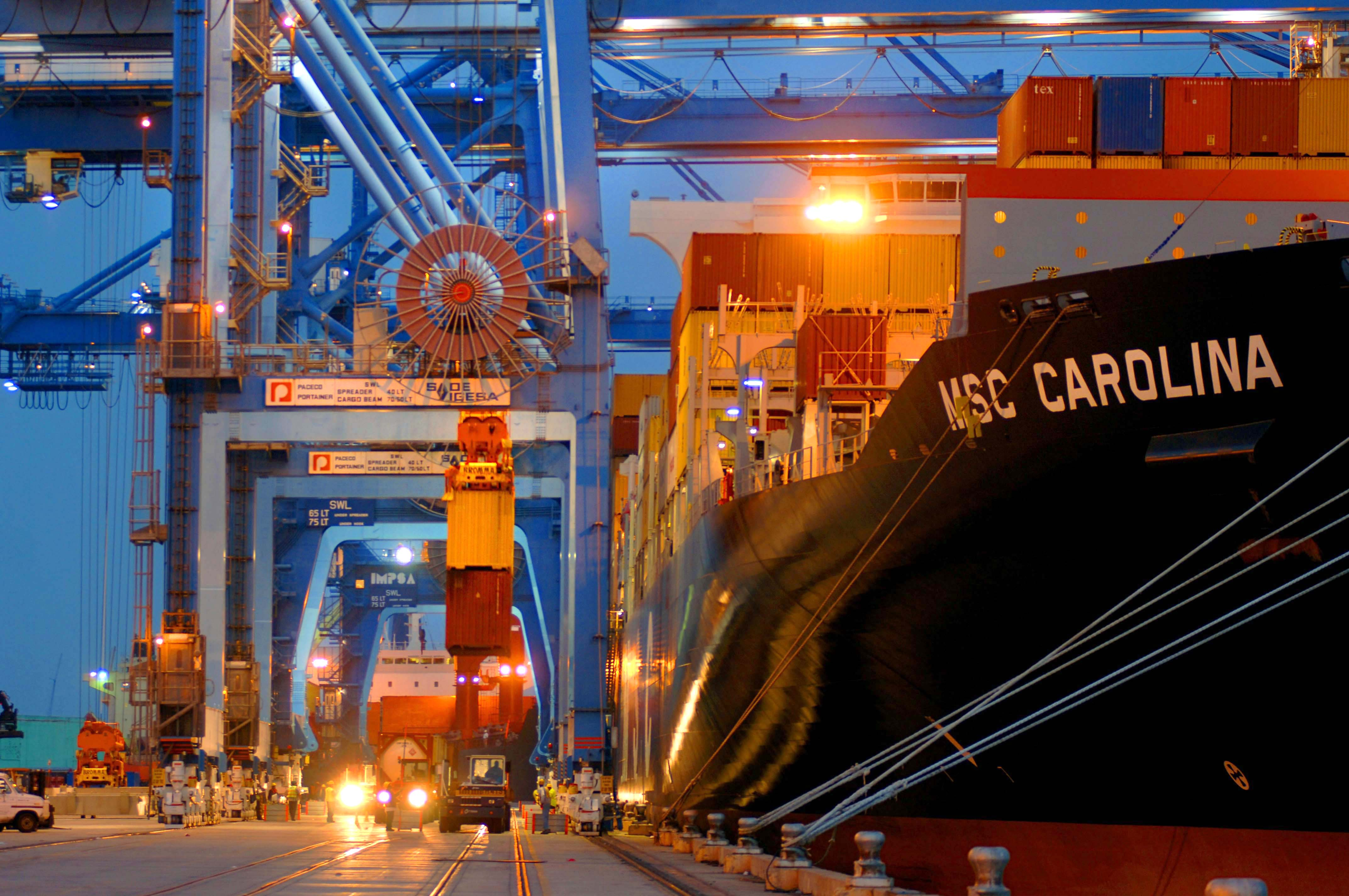
Container ships are used by shipping lines to transport cargo.

A shipping line or shipping company is a company whose line of business is ownership and operation of ships.

Shipping companies provide a method of distinguishing ships by different kinds of cargo:

1. Bulk cargo is a type of special cargo that is delivered and handled in large quantities.
2. General cargo, now known as break-bulk cargo, refers to a wide assortment of goods that may be delivered to several ports around the world.
3. Oil became a crucial part of the shipping industry in the early 20th century. Its use varied from lubrication for developed machinery, burning in boilers and industrial plants, as well as for operating engines. Oil is also primarily shipped by specific shipping companies as opposed to other forms of transportation. This is considered a type of special cargo. The shipping of oil has become a debated issue due to the environmental impacts of both oil spills and oil tankers.
4. Passenger cargo is the business of transporting people on shipping lines for the purposes of relocation or recreation. This became a growing industry near the turn of the twentieth century with the wide use of luxury ocean liners. Passenger cargo became a logistical challenge by attempting to balance pleasure voyage aspects with the structural limitations and requirements of the vessel.
5. Special cargo is a term used for one specific product being shipped to a specific port.

Inland shipping along rivers and other freshwater bodies are used to transport cargo to ports other than those along the coast. Inland shipping requires more infrastructure than ocean shipping. Rivers and lakes require infrastructure, such as river ports and canals, to be considered developed and ready for commercial use. Much of this infrastructure became more widely developed during the 19th and 20th centuries. Some principal waterways used by shipping lines in the 20th century were the Rhine, Amazon River, Congo River, Nile River, Mississippi River, and Columbia River. Examples of waterway infrastructure include the Suez Canal and the Panama Canal. These waterways are still in use for commercial purposes today. Some waterways can only operate under seasonal conditions. For example, the Great Lakes operate shipping for approximately eight months each year, but cannot continue operations during winter months when the lakes typically freeze. Most inland shipping lines are based on speed and efficiency to deliver cargo.

== Modern shipping ==
Contemporary maritime transportation is bound by geographical constraints, political regulation, and commercial interests. Modern advances and innovations in shipping technology have grown the shipping industry since the twentieth century. Many of these advances include the size of vessels, the size of fleets, specialty purposes for ships within the fleet, naval architecture and design, and automated ship systems. In terms of commercial interests, the maritime industry has a high level of contestability for shipping lines. This means that the ease of entering and leaving the industry is high. The cause of this is due to the purchase of secondhand ships, the return on which can often be covered fairly quickly for commercial ships. Newer, expensive ships require a larger return on the investment but pay off quickly. This is because these ships typically cater to a larger, more expensive crowd. For instance, new cruise ships can often be paid off within ten years due to the entrepreneurial nature of its intended purpose.

Innovations in the shipping industry are also being utilized by shipping lines to find solutions to global problems. For example, modern technology and research is being used to analyze the phenomenon of shipping containers disappearing while at sea. These problems are being researched in part by government agencies, such as the National Oceanic and Atmospheric Administration that operates in the Monterey Bay National Marine Sanctuary. While part of this issue is due to human error as a result of lack of enforcement, advances in technology and ship design hope to improve the rates at which containers may be lost at sea.

Other challenges being pursued in the maritime industry include adaptation to a more globalized economy. While the maritime industry has always remained global by nature, shipping lines are now experiencing phenomenon that is unprecedented in scale or unseen at all before the 21st century. Many of these issues surround the nature of increased cooperation in the maritime industry. For instance, cooperation among many shipping lines in the industry is causing an anticompetitive market. This is one of the reasons for the high level of contestability in the shipping industry. With more cooperation among shipping lines, there are larger rates of ships and companies entering and leaving the industry. As of 2019, business and economic analysts are attempting to find solutions to reduce the anticompetitive practices and promote competitive growth in the maritime industry.

== History ==
=== British shipping ===
Large-scale shipping lines became widespread in the nineteenth century, after the development of the steamship in 1783. At first, Great Britain was the centre of development; in 1819, the first steamship crossing of the Atlantic Ocean took place and by 1833, shipping lines had begun to operate steamships between Britain and British Empire possessions such as India and Canada. Three major British shipping lines were founded in the 1830s: the British and American Steam Navigation Company, the Great Western Steamship Company and the Peninsular Steam Navigation Company.

=== American shipping ===
The United States federal government passed the Shipping Act of 1916 as a protection agency for American shipping. The act, passed during World War I but before the nation officially entered the war, helped American shipping lines during a period when commercial shipping grew under the demands of the war. Under this act, the United States Shipping Board was also formed. In 1920, after the end of World War I, the federal government passed the Merchant Marine Act to protect American shipping interests in response to changing foreign shipping policy. The responsibilities established under the Shipping Act were eventually transferred to the Department of Commerce in 1933 by President Franklin D. Roosevelt. The Federal Maritime Commission was created in 1961 by President John F. Kennedy to regulate shipping activity in the United States, finally giving blanket authority to one shipping commission. At the same time, the United States Maritime Administration, or MARAD, was founded to regulate the merchant marine industry and fleet. However, a sharp rise in international ocean trade gave the two agencies expanded power in the growing maritime industry.

== See also ==
- List of ship companies
- Maritime transport
- Shipping portal
- World Shipping Council
