= Wong Chin Foo =

Chinese-American activist and journalist (1847–1898)

- 王淸福
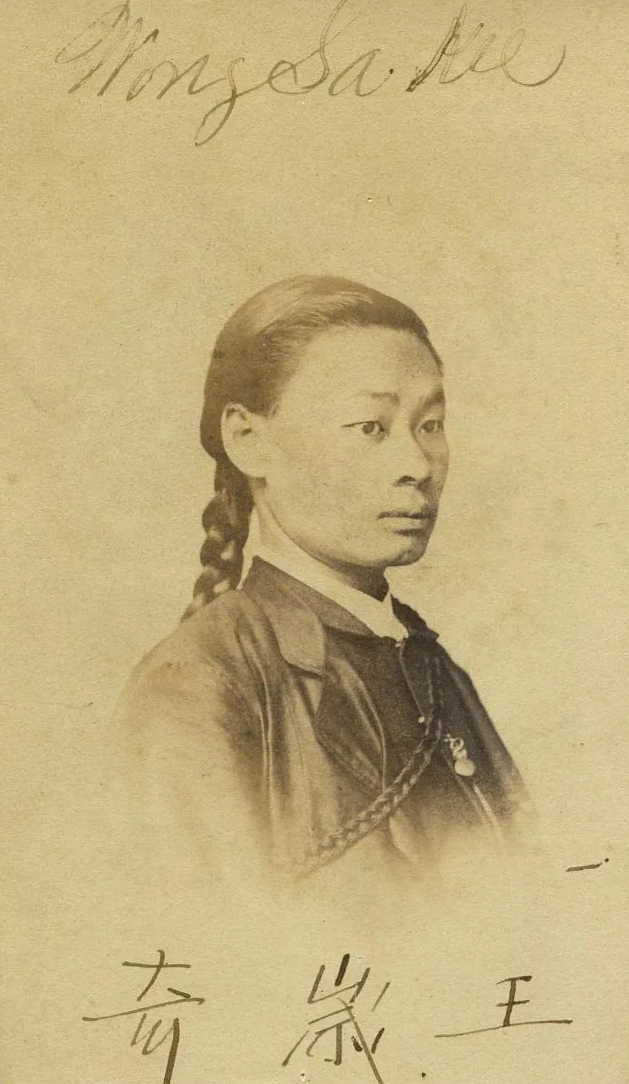
- Portrait by G. W. Chase c. 1867–1870
- Born: 1847; Jimo City, Shandong, China
- Died: 1898 (aged 50–51); Weihai, Shandong, China
- Occupations: Activist, journalist and lecturer
- Spouse: Liu Yu

Wong Chin Foo (Chinese: 王淸福; pinyin: Wáng Qīngfú; 1847–1898) was a Chinese American activist, journalist, lecturer, and a prolific Chinese contributor to the San Francisco press in the late 19th century.

Born in Jimo City, Shandong Peninsula, China, Wong was naturalized as a U.S. citizen in the early 1870s. He was dedicated to fighting for the equal rights of Chinese-Americans at the time of the Chinese Exclusion Act. Some commentators have compared aspects of Wong’s civil-rights activism to later leaders such as Martin Luther King Jr. or Mahatma Gandhi.

== Biography ==
Wong was born in 1847 in Jimo (Shandong) to a merchant family. In 1861, he was taken in by a missionary couple, and was baptized into the Baptist faith and came to the United States in 1867. In the following years he studied at Columbian College in Washington, D.C. and University at Lewisburg (later renamed Bucknell University) in Lewisburg, Pennsylvania in 1869–70, and left without finishing a degree.

Wong returned to China in 1870, after he studied and traveled in a number of American towns and cities. "He personally thought he would never see America again. If he did, he was very much mistaken." In 1871, Wong married Liu Yu San who was a student at Eliza Jewett Hartwell's mission school in Nanyang city. Wong took a new name Wong Yen Ping (Chinese: 王彥平; pinyin: Wáng Yánpíng), He worked for a short time in the Imperial Maritime Customs Service in Shanghai. He was dismissed and went to Ningbo city and Zhenjiang where he found a job as an interpreter in Customs House. While he was working in China, Wong was excommunicated from the Shanghai Baptist Church.

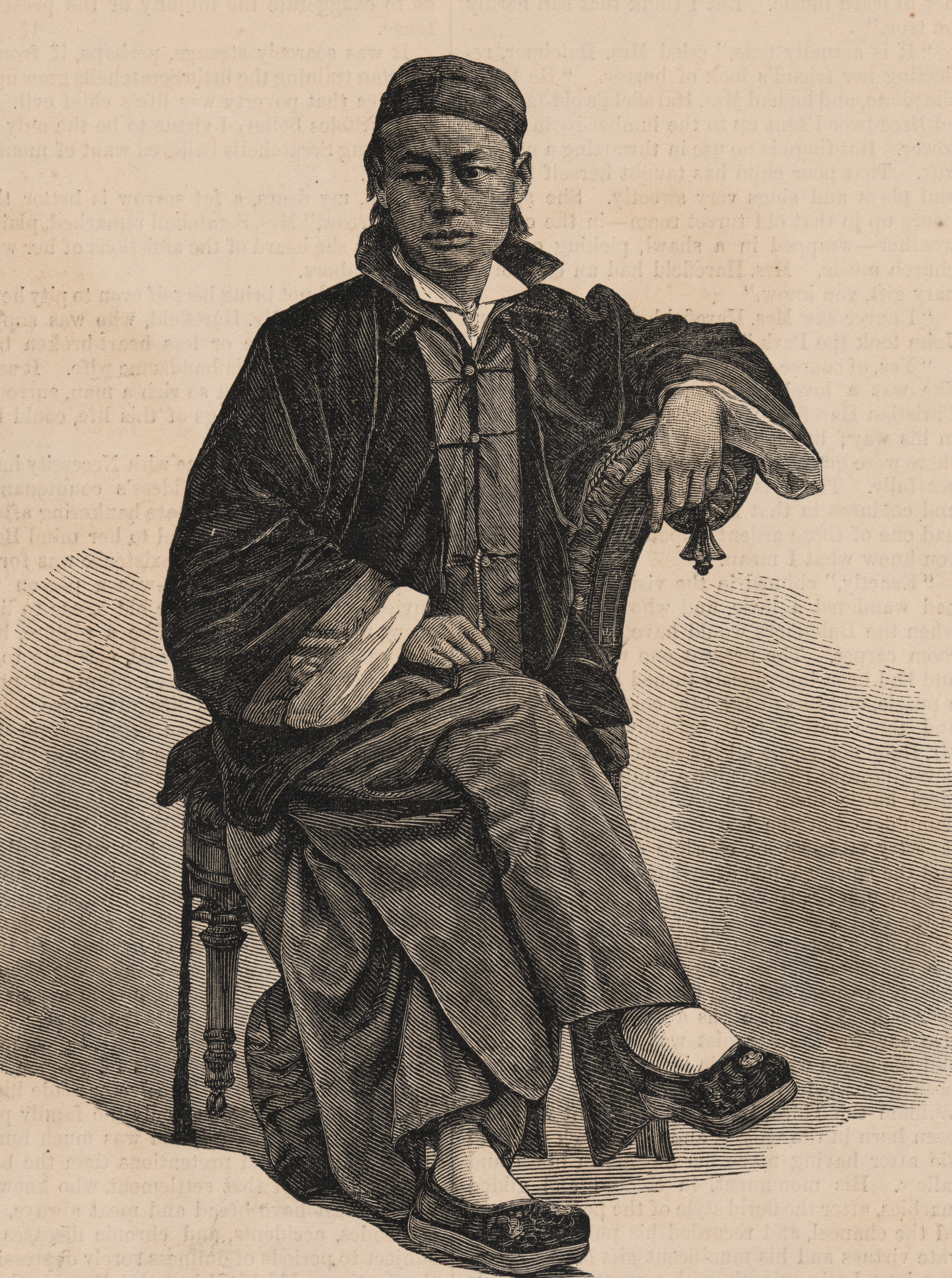
Wong pictured in Harpers Weekly, May 26, 1877

Wong advocated establishing a civic-improvement organization aimed at spiritual and moral uplift, social and economic reforms, and political change. He advocated to experience and absorb western culture. Wong campaigned for the prohibition of opium. Wong was involved in activities opposed to the Qing government. One of activities was known as the Zhenjiang Incident. While working at the Customs House he was implicated in the Zhenjiang Incident, which involved allegations of importing foreigners and weapons. Wong reportedly said he planned the "overthrow of this corrupt Chinese government". The Qing government reportedly placed a reward for his arrest; Wong then fled China, leaving his wife and child behind.

He then moved to Japan and (in 1873) back to the U.S. where he became a citizen in 1874. In the U.S., he lived mostly in the East and Midwest, traveling and lecturing. During this period anti-Chinese sentiment in the United States was widespread. Wong represented Chinese culture and promoted Chinese cuisine. He defended the Chinese community against charges of godlessness, depravity, and debauchery.

Wong organized an association of Chinese American voters and helped establish the Chinese Equal Rights League to campaign against the Chinese Exclusion Act and the 1892 Geary Act.

Wong accepted a federally appointed post as a Chinese inspector in 1893. Historians differ about how this position related to his opposition to the Geary Act: some argue it contradicted his earlier stance because the office involved enforcing immigration limits, while others contend he accepted the post to further his anti-opium efforts and to advocate for the civil rights of existing Chinese residents.

In 1896, he attempted to create a new political party which could represent Chinese Americans, then corresponded with Sun Yat-sen to propose a Chinese revolutionary junta.

Wong founded the Chinese-language newspaper Chinese American (the first such paper east of the Rockies). He campaigned against vice in Chinatown, survived several assassination attempts, and was involved in a successful libel suit against a man described in sources as a gang leader. Wong brought a Chinese theater in New York, established a language school and briefly opened a Confucian temple.

In 1898, he left the United States for a family reunion in China. In Hong Kong, he applied for a United States passport, which was issued but quickly revoked on orders from the State Department in Washington. When he proceeded to Shandong, he died of heart failure in Weihai.

== Activism ==
=== Civil rights ===
Wong founded the country's first association of Chinese American voters in 1884. Later he formed the Chinese Equal Rights League to campaign against the 1892 Geary Act, which intensified the U.S. policy of Chinese Exclusion and made it increasingly difficult for Chinese immigrants to acquire citizenship in the US. Wong "had clearly begun to grasp the importance of pressure politics and coalition-building." Wong organized a group of Americans with a vested interest in the Chinese goals who were unlikely to make their voices heard in Congress. The Chinese Equal Rights League sent letters to the press like the North China Herald (a newspaper for Americans in China) to push more pressure on the Congress committee. On January 26, 1893, Wong testified in front of a committee of the Congress as the president of the Chinese Equal Rights League. Wong defended Chinese Americans as law-abiding, wealthy and good mannered people. However, Wong was less successful in the give-and-take that followed with members of the committee, including Thomas J. Geary who originated the Geary Act. Despite struggling in testimony before Congress, Wong's effort had positive effect on his cause. Three months after the hearing, Secretary of the Treasury Carlisle approved modifications to the government's procedures for enforcing the Geary Act.

=== Cultural advocacy ===
Wong founded a weekly newspaper, The Chinese American, in New York City in 1883. His work was published in periodicals including the North American Review and Chautauquan. When a visitor to a saloon in New York's Chinatown accused a Chinese grocery of handling small cats and rats, Wong offered $500 reward for anyone who could prove that Chinese ate cats or rats, an offer which was not taken up. The incident provoked Wong into writing an article on Chinese food for the Brooklyn Eagle which offers a rich description of Chinese cooking, in which he says "chop soly", that is, Chop Suey "may justly be called the national dish of China" (though it is not the dish usually called Chop Suey in the United States).

In 1873, he began a speaking tour across the country, primarily speaking at Eastern and Midwestern cities to educate Americans on Chinese culture, frequently catching the attention of major sources of media such as the New York Times and the Boston Globe. Through these speeches, Wong sought to challenge Chinese discrimination in America by drawing similarities between Chinese and American morals, primarily centering his arguments around religion. In a time when the Asian American movement as a whole had yet to have been conceived, Wong Chin Foo focused his efforts on Chinese Americans who already lived in the United States at the time, even favoring the exclusion of further Chinese immigrants. He ultimately sought to acquire political privileges such as citizenship and voting rights for the pre-existing Chinese Americans.

In 1887 Wong Chin Foo published the essay "Why Am I a Heathen?", which provoked controversy and elicited responses from contemporaries. He explained his rejection of Christianity in favor of traditional Chinese beliefs. Prior to this essay, it was common for Wong Chin Foo to endorse Confucianism and point out his critiques of Protestant missionaries. But he would also seek to establish common grounds between Confucianism and Christianity. This essay marked a transformation from his previous, more conciliatory stance, and it prompted a number of responses, including "Why I Am Not a Heathen", written by his fellow Chinese immigrant Yan Phou Lee, a devout Christian.

Wong publicly confronted Denis Kearney, and, in one reported incident, challenged him to a duel, offering a choice of "chopsticks, Irish potatoes, or Krupp guns." He was a supporter of Sun Yat-Sen's revolutionary message.

== Different receptions within the community ==
Wong was targeted by gangsters, which some historians link to his campaigns against opium, gambling and prostitution and his involvement in certain court cases. He survived multiple assassination attempts.

Other Chinese Americans disagreed with Wong's stance on Christianity. For example, "Why I Am Not a Heathen" by Yan Phou Lee was written as a rebuttal against Wong's arguments directed at the Church, with his primary argument being that those who joined with the Chinese-exclusion movement were not true Christians. Over the course of his lecturing career, he increasingly criticized Christianity, which drew criticism from many Chinese Americans.

Friction between regional affiliations within the Chinese community also made it difficult for Wong Chin Foo to amass larger support from Chinese immigrants. The idea of a cohesive Chinese identity had yet to be popularized amongst the Chinese community, even though other Americans hardly recognized this differentiation. At this time, nearly all Chinese immigrants in America came from rural counties of the Guangdong province, located in southern China. Even then, they typically affiliated themselves with the specific county they originated. Coming from the north, which had a reputation of education and wealth, and speaking a distinct dialect from the southerners, Wong Chin Foo encountered additional difficulties garnering the support from the Chinese immigrant community. Some sources suggest that, while he advocated for the rights of Chinese Americans generally, Wong showed particular sympathy toward northern Chinese immigrants.

== In popular culture ==
There is a play called Citizen Wong inspired by Wong Chin Foo.
