= Pontianak (disambiguation) =

Pontianak is the capital of the Indonesian province of West Kalimantan.

Pontianak may also refer to:

- Pontianak (film), a 1957 Singaporean horror film
- Pontianak (folklore), a vampiric ghost in Indonesian and Malay mythology
- Pontianak Sultanate, a former Islamic Malay state, centred on the current Pontianak city
- Pontianak-class sloop, steam ships of the Royal Netherlands Navy
