= Mercedes Godoy =

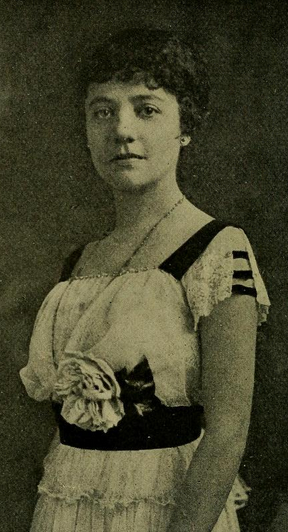
- Mercedes Godoy, in the frontispiece of her memoir, When I Was a Girl in Mexico (1919).
- Born: March 16, 1890; Mexico City
- Died: After 1932
- Occupation(s): Writer, socialite

Mercedes Godoy (March 16, 1890 – after 1932) was a Mexican socialite in the United States, and author of When I Was a Girl in Mexico (1919).

== Early life ==
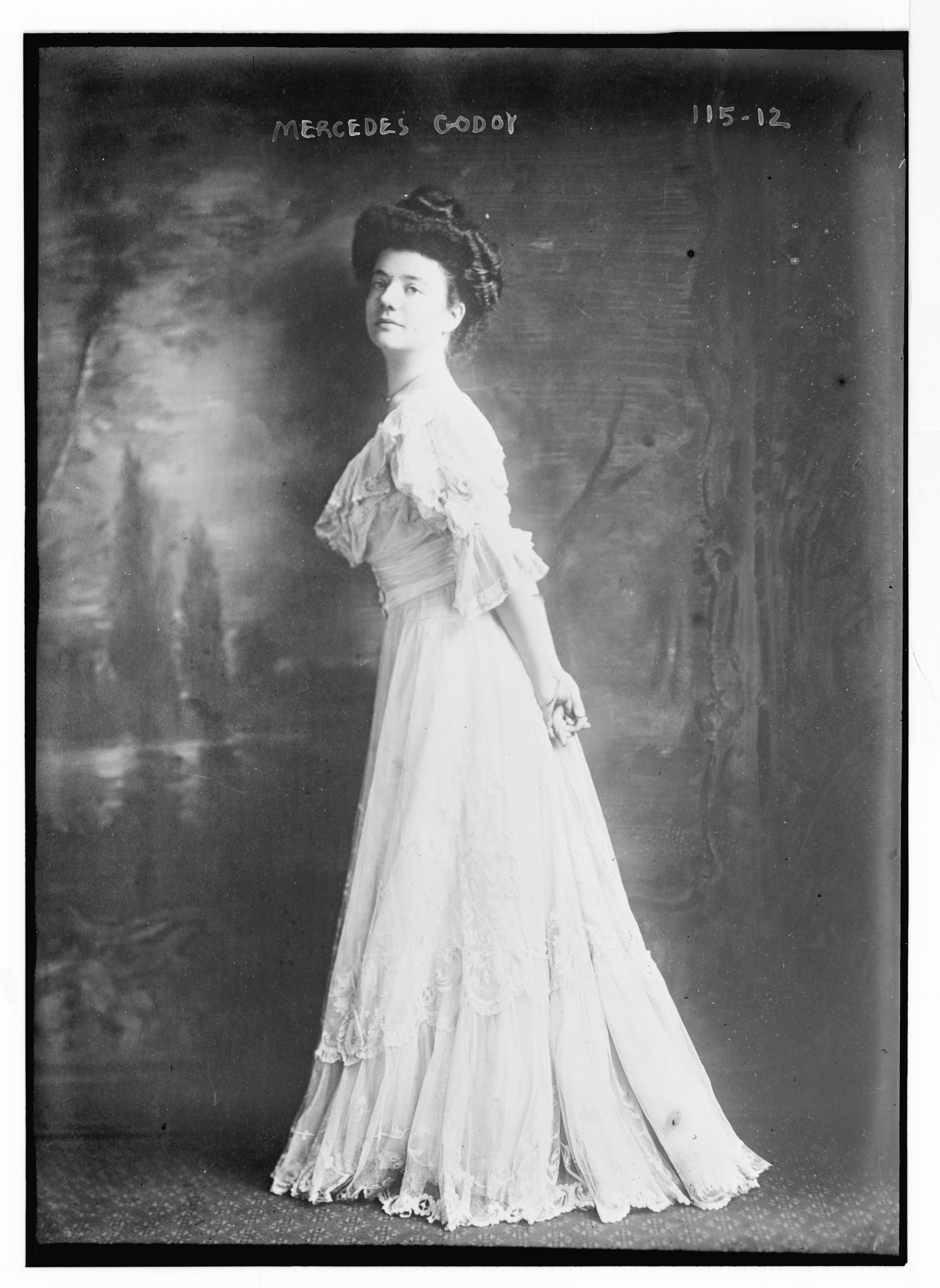
Mercedes Godoy, standing LCCN2014680657

Mercedes Godoy was born in Mexico City, the daughter of José Francisco Godoy (1851–1930) and Adela Perrin de Godoy. Her father was a Mexican-born United States citizen, a writer, translator, and diplomat who served in Cuba, Guatemala, and the United States. Her grandfather, José Antonio Godoy, was Mexican consul in San Francisco.

== Career ==
Godoy was a debutante in the 1905–1906 social season in Washington, D.C., while her father was the Mexican consul in that city. She was described as resembling Alice Roosevelt Longworth. She was a delegation aide to the Women's Auxiliary Committee, at the Second Pan-American Scientific Conference in 1915.

Godoy was a trained singer. In 1915, she sang at a musical evening given by the Musical Harmony Club at the Colonial School for Girls. In 1916, she became vice-president of the Harmony Improvement Society. In 1917, she was on the committee for a Red Cross benefit dance at the Cairo hotel. In 1918, she appeared in a one-act play in Spanish, at a benefit for earthquake relief in Guatemala.

In 1919 Godoy published a memoir of her childhood games, holidays, foods, and other details, When I Was a Girl in Mexico. "This book will be a revelation to those American children who imagine that Mexican is a synonym for bandits," predicted one reviewer. It was part of the "Children of Other Lands" series about childhoods in different cultures, including Hólmfríður Árnadóttir's When I Was a Girl in Iceland, Cornelia De Groot's When I Was a Girl in Holland, Mousa J. Kaleel's When I Was a Boy in Palestine, and Yan Phou Lee's When I Was a Boy in China.

== Personal life ==
Godoy lived in Washington, Havana, and New York as a young woman, with her parents and her siblings. She was living in Mexico City when her mother died in 1923.
