= Hólmfríður =

Hólmfríður is a given name. Notable people with the name include:

- Hólmfríður Árnadóttir (1873–1955), Icelandic writer
- Hólmfríður Karlsdóttir (born 1963), Icelandic model
- Hólmfríður Magnúsdóttir (born 1984), Icelandic footballer
