= 24 cm K L/20 =

1867 German Navy rifled breech loader

24 cm Kanone L/20
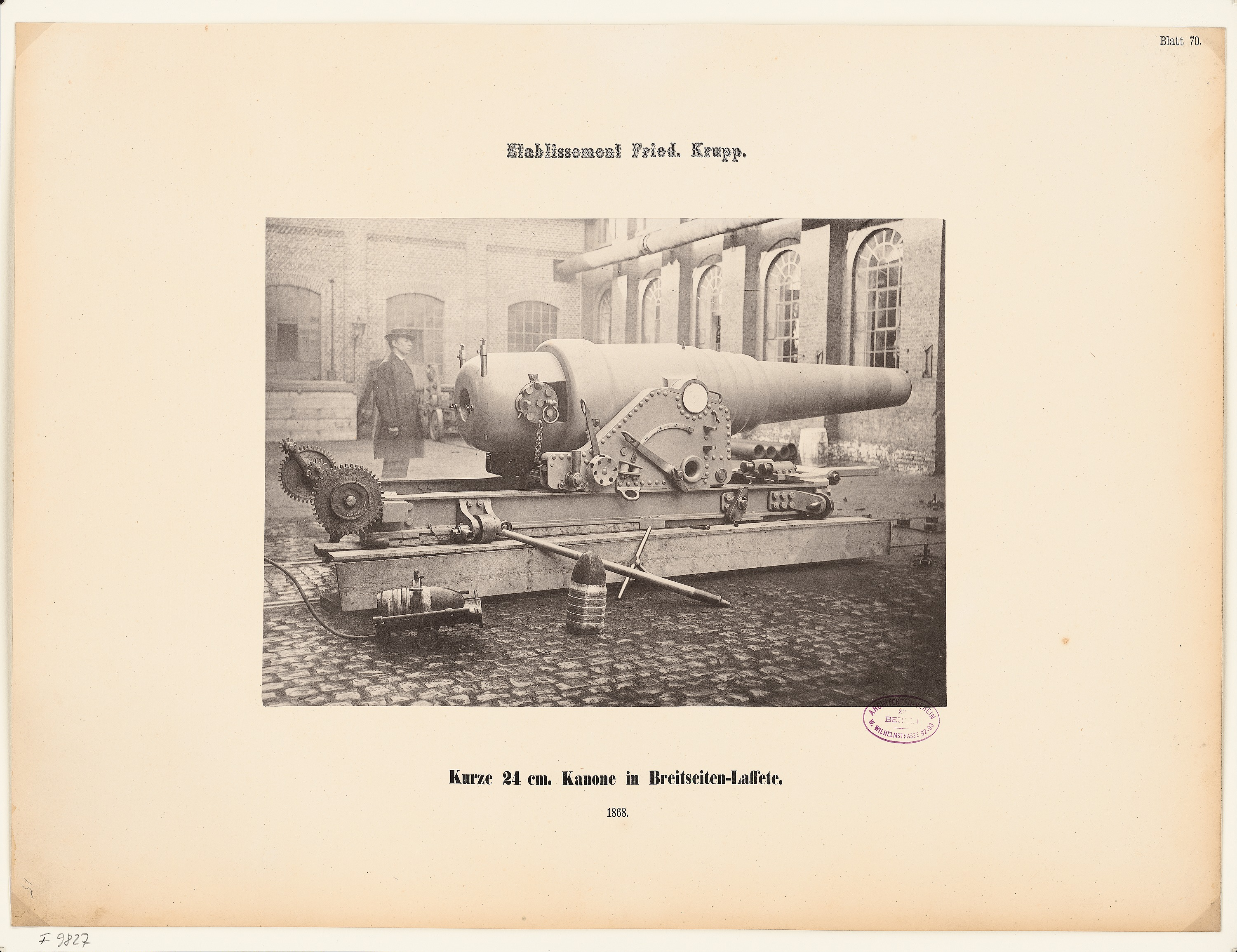
- 24 cm RK L/20 on a broadside carriage 1868
- Type: Naval gun
- Place of origin: Kingdom of Prussia

Service history
- Used by: Imperial German Navy

Production history
- Designer: Krupp
- Designed: 1867
- Manufacturer: Krupp
- Produced: 1867

Specifications
- Mass: 14,500 kg
- Length: 4.708 m (L/20)
- Caliber: 235.4 mm
- Breech: horizontal sliding wedge
- Muzzle velocity: 431 m/s

The 24 cm K L/20 was a 24 cm caliber Krupp gun which was the first heavy Ring Kanone or built-up gun used by Germany. It was a rifled breech loader with a Krupp cylindroprismatic sliding breech and a Broadwell ring.

The 24 cm K L/20 was also known as 96-pdr, 9 inch gun and kurze 24 cm Ring Kanone. It saw extensive testing of several new concepts.

== Background ==
In 1858, Prussia decided to use rifled breechloading guns of 9, 12 and 15 cm caliber for its artillery. The idea was that the same guns would be used for the navy and coastal defense. However, tests in the early 1860s showed that even the 15 cm rifled breechloader was almost useless against the standard 114 mm ship armor of the time. In mid-April 1862, this led to a recommendation to develop a 36-pdr caliber (17 cm) gun. In late April 1862, this was followed by a recommendation to develop a 19.3 cm (48-pdr caliber) gun. In mid 1864 trials showed that the developed 19.3 cm gun was still too light.

In Fall 1864 the Prussian Navy then ordered its first massive steel 21 cm rifled breechloaders a.k.a. as 72-pdrs. These were made according to a design by the Navy Departement. To all appearances, the Prussian, Austrian and Russian navies planned to standardize on an 8-inch gun. For Russia, this was a 20.3 cm gun. For Prussia, it was a 21 cm gun, because Prussia used the slightly longer Prussian inch called Zoll of 26.154 mm. 8 Prussian inches equaled 209.2 mm.

Even before the first Prussian 21 cm gun started its trials, its Inspection of the Artillery advised to develop an even heavier caliber gun in February 1865. This was based on the artillery developments in foreign countries and the general increase in armor thickness. Combined with other developments, this would lead the Prussian Navy to order two 24 cm guns for testing in 1867. Krupp then proposed to use the ring or built up construction, which led to the first two 24 cm Kanone L/20 being delivered in December 1867.

After the 24 cm Kanone L/20 had been tested, a longer version was designed and ordered. This would become the 24 cm Ring Kanone L/22. Somewhat before mid December 1868, Krupp got the order to design this longer version of the 24 cm Kanone L/20 and a longer version of the 21 cm RK L/19. The L/22 was supposed to have the same weight as the L/20 but would become significantly heavier. It was used in coastal defence.

== Characteristics ==
=== Names and models ===
The names 96-pdr and '9 inch gun' for the 24 cm K L/20 and the longer 24 cm RK L/22 are due to the shift from traditional to newer systems to denote the caliber (inner diameter) of a gun barrel. In the traditional system for smoothbore muzzleloading guns, the caliber was denoted by the weight of the shot in pounds. This made sense, because all shot were the same i.e. round, giving a direct relation between the two. When rifled guns were introduced, the shot became cylindrical. The designation 96-pounder therefore meant: of a caliber that could fire a 96-pound round bullet.

The 96-pdr would actually fire a cylindrical shot of about 300 pounds. Due to this marked difference, the English and American rifled guns of about the same caliber were named 300-pounders. The Prussian Navy did not follow this practice, but continued to officially refer to 96-pdrs. When a slightly longer model of the 24 cm K L/20 was made, the two were held apart by the designations 'kurzer Ring 96-pfdr 180" lang' and 'langer Ring 96-pfdr 200" lang'.

The name 9 inch gun or 9 zölliges is in line with current practice to refer to the actual inner diameter of the gun. In January 1867 the Prussian Navy ordered Krupp to design a 9-inch (96-pdr) gun barrel. This was the 24 cm K L/20, which had a caliber of 235.4 mm. From this measurement we know that Krupp designed a gun with a caliber of 9 Prussian inch or Zöll, which explains why Krupp and others liked to refer to the 9 inch gun.

When the Prussian Navy shifted to the metric system, the guns received the names 'kurze 24 cm Kanone' and 'lange 24 cm Kanone'. In 1885, the kurze 24 cm Ring Kanone was renamed '24 cm Kanone L/20' abbreviated: '24 cm K L/20'. The lange 24 cm Kanone was renamed '24 cm Ring Kanone L/22' abbreviated: '24 cm RK L/22'.

=== Characteristics of the 24 cm L/20 ===
The design of the 24 cm K L/20 had been ordered in January 1867. Just like previous Krupp guns built for Prussia, it was a rifled breech loader. Other characteristics were new for the Prussian Navy: The built-up gun barrel consisted of an inner tube strengthened by two more tubes. The breech was Krupp's cylindroprismatic variant of its horizontal sliding wedge breech block. Of the first two guns, one used a Broadwell ring for obturation, the other used copper scales.

The caliber was 235.4 mm. This amounted to 9 Prussian inches of 26.154 mm. Overall length was 4.708 m. Weight including breech was 14,500 kg. The breech block itself weighed 625 kg. The length in calibers was 4.708 m / 0.2354 mm = L/20. At the time of its introduction, the caliber length was not part of the gun's name.

There were two carriages: the 24 cm Rahmen Laffete C/76 84 for broadside use, and the 24 cm Pivot Laffete C/85 for use as a pivot gun.

The ammunition that the 24 cm K L/20 could fire was: 24 cm grenade C/69 aptirt; 24 cm grenade L/2,7; 24 cm Hartgussgranate C/69 aptirt; and 24 cm Steel grenade.

== Design, development, and trials ==
=== The first built-up guns ===
Unlike the preceding massive 21 cm RK L/19, the 24 cm Ring Kanone had a built-up gun barrel. Here, Krupp followed the British example. In the 1850s, the Armstrong gun had appeared. It was basically a rifled breech loader that was built-up, instead of having been cast in a single piece. The built-up construction allows pre-stressing of the innermost tube of the barrel, allowing it to withstand much higher pressures than when the gun is cast in a single piece. In time, Krupp proved itself to be the best manufacturer of gun barrels due to the cast steel that it used. This was the famous Kruppstahl. Even the Elswick Ordnance Company, which exported guns designed by Armstrong, used Krupp castings for the inner tubes of its gun barrels.

=== How Krupp came to develop a large caliber built-up breechloader ===
At the time, it was usual for gun manufacturers to order cast gun barrels at Krupp or another manufacturer, and to turn them into a complete artillery piece on their own premises. The practice that Krupp only cast the gun barrels was changed by orders from Russia. In 1863 Russia ordered 16 9 inch (22.86 cm) guns at Krupp and about 80 8 inch guns, probably all still muzzle loaders. These orders gave Krupp the opportunity to develop itself as an artillery manufacturer.

The major doubts about using rifled breech loading built-up guns of larger caliber centered on the breech system and the obturation. The problems were caused by the built-up guns using far higher explosive pressures in the gun barrel. In the United Kingdom, these problems surfaced in the RBL 7-inch Armstrong gun a.k.a. the 110-pounder. This was an early British 178 mm rifled built-up breech loader. When the problems could not be solved, production of the 110-pounder was discontinued in 1864, and the United Kingdom reverted to muzzle loaders for the higher calibers. The main reason was that muzzle loaders were able to withstand the higher pressures needed to fire a projectile with the speed required to penetrate armor.

In that same year 1864, Krupp invented the cylindroprismatic variant Rundkeil of its horizontal sliding wedge breech. This was essential for the development of its built-up gun, the so-called Ring Kanone. The cylindroprismatic breech could withstand far higher explosive pressures than the square variant. It also allowed to use much less metal near the breach, which in turn allowed a rational construction of the Ring Kanone. Krupp's work on the barrel itself used the work of the Russian general Axel Gadolin, who had built on Lamé's work regarding elasticity and developed a practical application.

In 1866 Krupp created an 8" built-up gun called 'Ring Kanone' and tested it. That same year Russia ordered 25 8" Ring Kanone, and a single 9" one. The latter was tested in Russia in 1867, and led to an order for 62 more 9" Ring Kanone in 1868.

=== The Prussian 24 cm Ring Kanone ===
In January 1867, the Prussian Navy ordered its first two 24 cm Ring Kanonen, see above. In fact, this January 1867 order was one to design a 9-inch / 96-pdr gun barrel. After the design drawing of an inner tube reinforced by two ring tubes came in, the Prussian Navy ordered two barrels. Both would get the Krupp simple cylindroprismatic breech. For obturation, gun number 1 used copper scales. Gun number 2 used a Broadwell ring. The powder chamber was first designed for 12.5–15 kg of regular gunpowder, but this was increased after the trials of the 9 inch Ring Kanone for Russia, which were attended by many Prussian officers.

=== Comparative tests (1868) ===
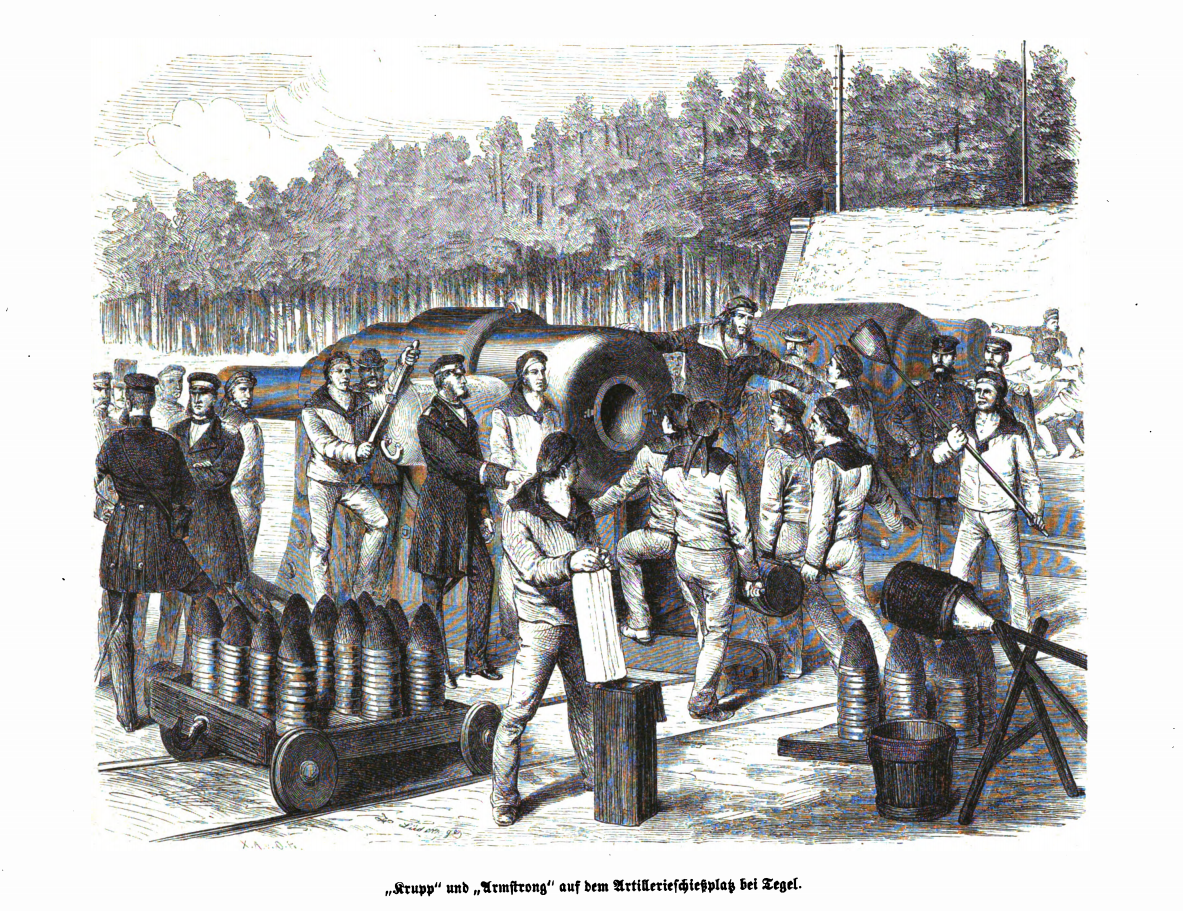
The 24 cm K L/20 in Tegel in 1868. It is recognizable by the coils, the open rear, and the breech block.

After arriving in Berlin in December 1867, the two 24 cm guns were brought to the Tegel Shooting range (Tegeler Schießplatz) in Tegel, Berlin. They were to be tested together with the heavy and light versions of the massive 21 cm breechloaders mentioned above. The targets were mockup ship hulls with armor of 5, 6, 7, 8, and 9 British inch thickness. Behind the armor there were the regular supporting wooden layers of teak, oak and other wood, some of which were 737 mm thick. The armor came from the Brown factory in Sheffield.

=== Preliminary tests of the Krupp 9 inch Ring Kanone ===
Before the trials, there was separate shooting to determine the velocity of the guns involved. For this a Boulengé chronograph was placed 47 m from the muzzle of the guns. It was determined that with a charge of 21 kg of black gunpowder, the 24 cm gun fired a bullet with a speed of 347.5 m/s. This was disappointing, but still much better than the 21 cm massive guns.

On 31 March 1868 official trials were held at Tegel. Only 11 shots were fired, 7 of these by the 24 cm guns. The outcome was bad. The 9 inch gun was ineffective against armor over 7 inch thick, even at short distances.

It was obvious that the 24 cm gun could only be made effective if the velocity by which it fired shot was increased. There were three options to do this:

- Increasing the load of regular black gunpowder
- Decreasing the resistance that the rifling system produced
- Using a quicker burning gunpowder

These options to increase velocity failed. The only result was a small increase in velocity by increasing the charge of black gunpowder to 22.5 kg

=== Preliminary tests of the rival 9 inch Armstrong gun ===
As the Prussian Navy was about to arm its first armored ships, it had to make a choice for the main guns. The 9 inch Ring Kanone was a logical candidate, but it got a rival when the navy ordered a 9-inch Woolwich gun from the United Kingdom. This was the RML 9-inch Armstrong Gun, which was the Elswick Ordnance Company version of the RML 9-inch 12-ton gun that the British Royal Arsenal in Woolwich made for the Royal Navy.

On some main characteristics, the Krupp 9 inch Ring Kanone and the Elswick 9 inch Woolwich gun compared as follows: Caliber 235.4 mm vs. 228.6 mm; Length 4.708 m vs. 3.962 m; Weight 14,650 kg vs. 13,100 kg. The Woolwich gun used the fast burning large grained rifle powder which was able to create a high velocity in the relatively short barrel.

Just like the 24 cm Ring Kanone, the 9 inch Armstrong gun was subjected to some preliminiary tests. Trials were held with a shot of 113.5 kg and a charge of 19.5 kg of British gunpowder. These yielded an average velocity of 404 m/s. Some more trials were held in which the Armstrong 9 inch gun fired at a wooden target of 5 by 5 meters at a distance of 900 m. As the biggest deviation was only 1.7 m, the accuracy was very satisfactory.

=== Comparative trials on 2 June 1868 ===
The first comparative trials of the British and Prussian guns against the mock-up armored hulls took place on 2 June 1868. The Krupp 9 inch Ring Kanone fired 152.5 kg shot propelled by 22.5 kg of regular Prussian gunpowder and attained a velocity of about 351 m/s. The 9 inch Woolwich gun fired shot of 113.5 kg propelled by a charge of 19.5 kg of British (large grained rifle) powder. It attained a velocity of 404 m/s.

The result of these trials against armor were clear. The Woolwich gun penetrated all the mock-up armored hulls. The Krupp 9 inch Ring Kanone was useless against the 7 and 8 inch armor plating.

=== Investigation of the failure of the 9 inch Ring Kanone ===
For Krupp, the results of the first comparative trials were very disappointing. Two causes were investigated: the higher velocity of the Woolwich gun, and the form of the shot.

The recent invention of tools that could measure the velocity of bullets made that scientists were already able to apply scientific theory to the problem. The Kinetic energy or Vis viva with which the shot hit the armor plating could be calculated from the weight and speed of the shot.

$$E_\text{k} = \frac{1}{2} mv^2$$

It was found that the difference in kinetic energy was not so great that it could by itself explain the superiority of the Woolwich gun. A big part of the underperformance of the Krupp gun seemed to be caused by the heavy lead covering and the form of the Prussian shot. If the weight of this lead covering was subtracted from the weight of the Prussian shot, the calculation of the kinetic energy did explain the results.

=== Measures to improve the gun ===
In order to increase velocity, Krupp changed the 96-pdr number 2 to use ignition through the breech block. It would also use prismatic gunpowder, which proved crucial. A charge of 24 kg of regular gunpowder had led to a velocity of 357 m/s. The same charge of prismatic gunpowder led to a velocity of 392 m/s. The prismatic gunpowder also led to a dramatic increase in accuracy. It even made the Krupp gun more accurate than the Woolwich gun.

To address the problem of the form and heavy lead covering of the Prussian shot, several new shot were tested. The new types of shot had a longer and sharper head with a diameter that aimed to cover the hull and bottom of the shot from hitting the armor. The Gruson shot used lead rings that weighed far less than the previous lead covering (mantle).

=== Comparative trials in July–August 1868 ===
On 7 July 1868 the Krupp gun was again fired against the mock-up ship hulls. With a charge of 24 kg of prismatic gunpowder it fired improved shot which used less lead. The new Gruson shot weighed 150–163 kg and were fired with an average velocity of 392 m/s. The new Krupp shot weighed about 125 kg and were fired with an average velocity of 431 m/s. The Woolwich gun was also tested again.

The results showed that the Krupp gun was now more effective against the armor plates than the Woolwich gun. This was also confirmed by calculations of the kinetic energy for the higher velocity of the Krupp gun. However, the lead rings of the Gruson shot were found to be very defective.

On 4 August new trials were held. They would test a Gruson shot of 153 kg that did again use the heavy lead covering, but retained the other improvements to the shot. It was opposed by a lengthened Palliser shot fired by the Woolwich gun. This test showed that with these shot, the Krupp gun was only about as effective as the Woolwich gun.

On the same day, these trials also tested the grenades (i.e. shot that explode after impact) used for the British and Prussian 9 inch guns. In this respect the Prussian grenades proved superior to the Palliser grenades.

=== Further trials ===
In November 1868 improved shot were tested with both guns. The new Palliser shot were found to be no improvement, even though Armstrong objected that they had not been made by Palliser. The improved Gruson shot had a much thinner lead covering, and weighed only 141 kg. A new steel grenade by Krupp weighed 132 kg and contained 5 kg explosives.

A final test of both guns was about their durability. Both guns would have to fire 600 shot with the maximum regular charge. The trial of the 9 inch Woolwich gun proved that it became unsuitable for service after 200-250 shots. The test even had to be stopped after 292 shots, when it became too dangerous to fire the gun due to cracks in the barrel. The Krupp gun fired 676 shots without much problems. However, on 28 November a defective grenade exploded in the barrel, causing a crack and destroying the rifling. Even so, this crack was not yet dangerous.

In January 1869, the Prussian War Office then declared the official end of the trials between the Prussian and British guns.

== Use ==
=== The Prussian naval artillery systems ===
The trials of the 24 cm gun had been concluded with a very positive outcome for the Krupp guns. The authorities then had to decide which guns they wanted to order.

For the coastal artillery, the Artillerie Prüfungskommission (Artillery test commission) issued a report on 22 April 1869. It advised to order 15 cm, 21 cm, and 27 (later 28) cm Ring Kanone. The commission judged that the 24 cm Ring Kanone did not differ enough from the 21 cm gun to justify its inclusion in the coastal artillery system.

For the on board artillery, there was also the matter of how much gun weight a ship could support. In 1869, the navy department therefore decided that the armored frigates would use the 24 cm Ring Kanone and the 21 cm gun. The turret ships would use a 26 cm and 17 cm gun. Smaller ships would also use 15 and 12 cm guns.

Somewhat before mid December 1868, Krupp got the order to design longer versions of the 24 and 21 cm guns, but of the same weight. This would lead to the 24 cm RK L/22's inclusion in the coastal artillery system.

=== On board ships ===
The armored frigate SMS König Wilhelm had 18 24 cm Kanone L/20 mounted in the broadside.
