= Samarang-class gunvessel =

Class of Dutch naval vessels

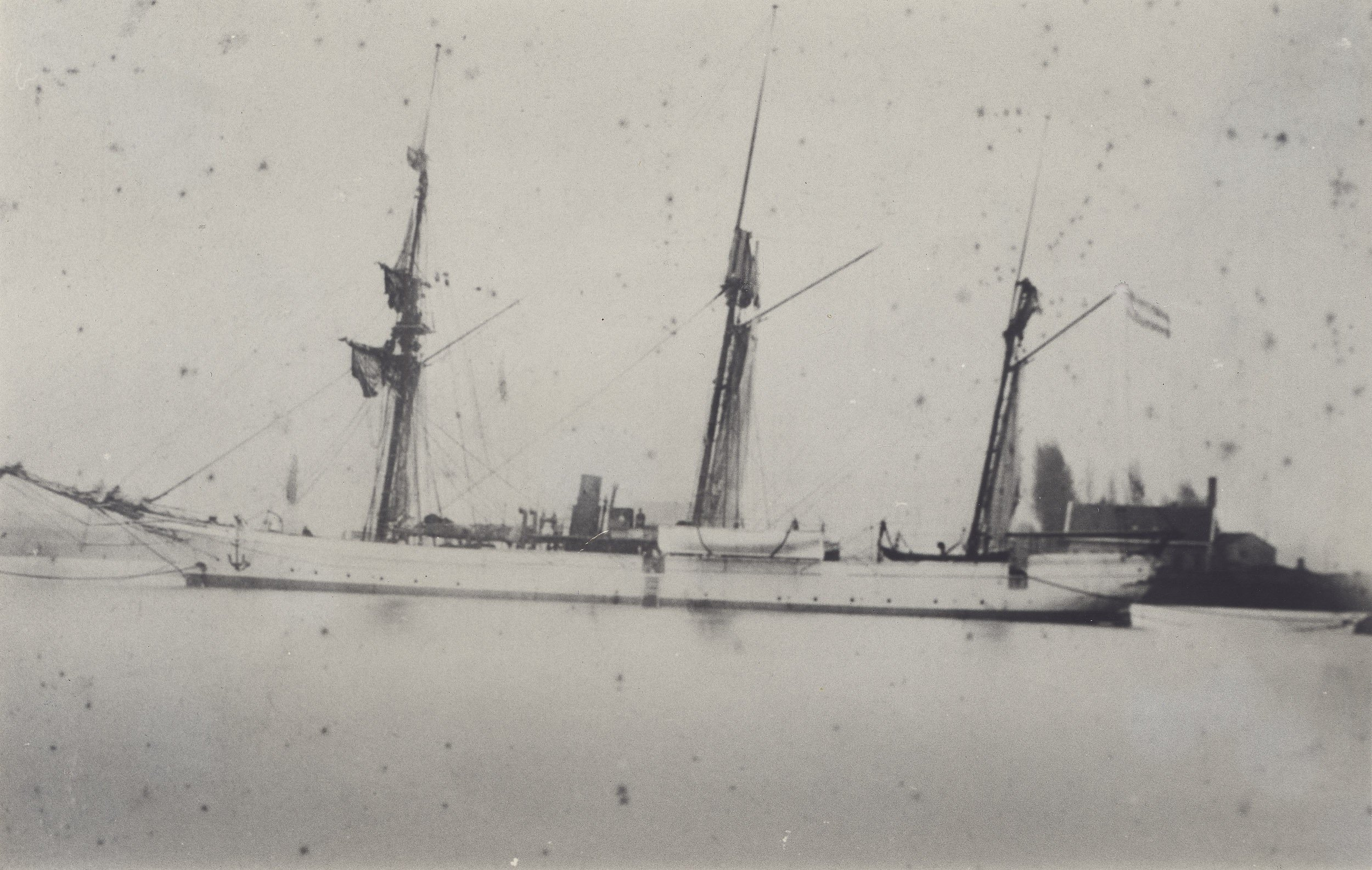
- The screw gunvessel Samarang in 1876

Class overview
- Name: Samarang class
- Builders: Koinklijke Fabriek van Stoom- en andere Werktuigen, NSBM Fijenoord
- Operators: Royal Netherlands Navy; Indies Military Navy
- Preceded by: Pontianak class
- Cost: 445,190 guilders
- Completed: 6
- Scrapped: 5
- Preserved: 1

General characteristics
- Type: Gunvessel
- Displacement: 853 tons
- Length: 45 m (147 ft 8 in)
- Beam: 8.86 m (29 ft 1 in)
- Draught: 3.50 m (11 ft 6 in)
- Installed power: 100 nominal horsepower
- Speed: 8.25 knots (sail); 10.0 knots (machines trial)
- Complement: 75
- Armament: 1 * RML 7-inch Armstrong Gun; 2 * 12 cm K.A. BL; or: 1 * 15 cm A No. 1; 3 * 12 cm K.A. BL
- Armour: none

The Samarang class was a class of steam screw gunvessels of the Royal Netherlands Navy. The class originally comprised Samarang, Batavia and Makassar, but was later extended.

== The Dutch colonial navy in the 1870s ==
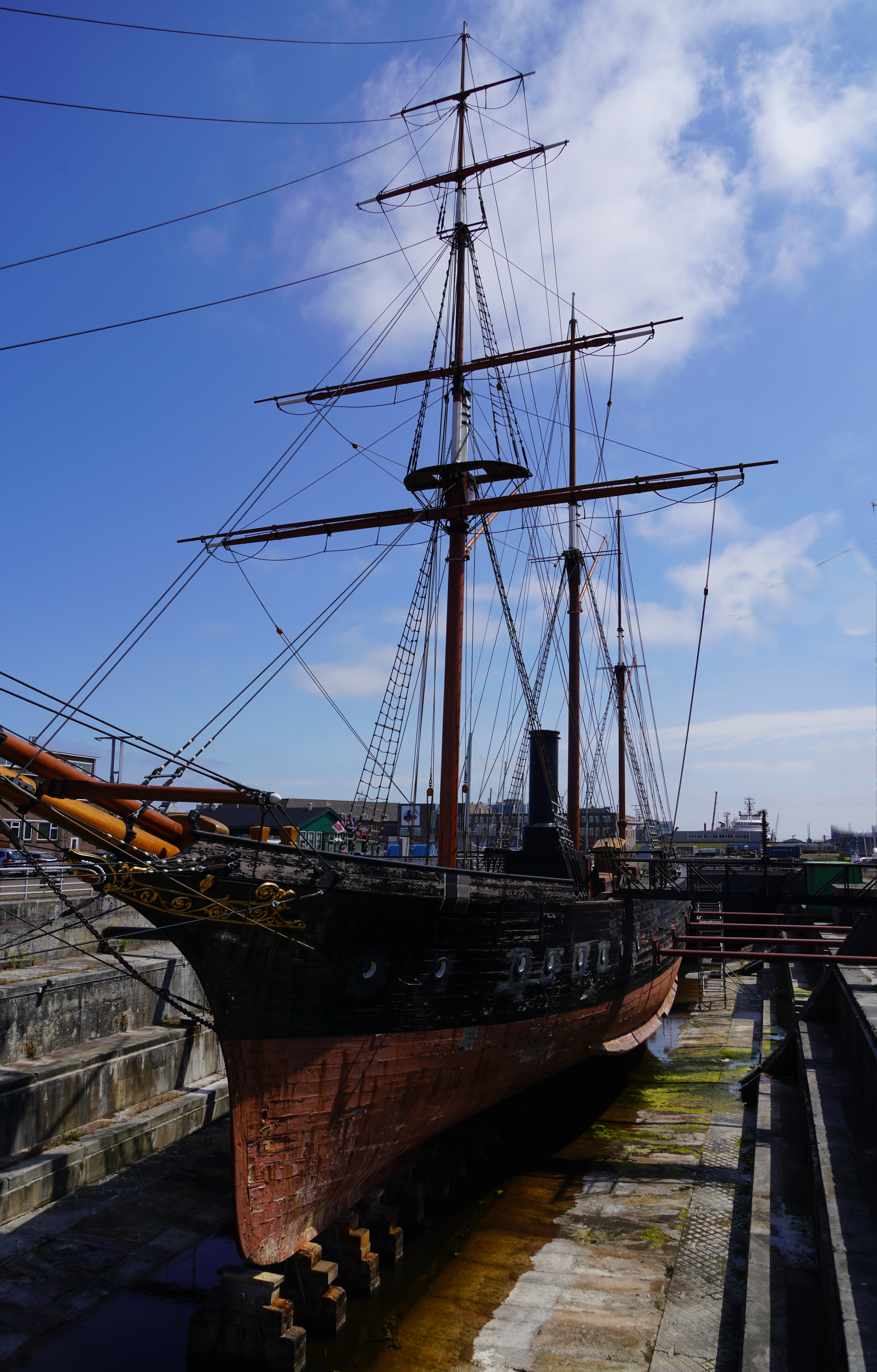
HNLMS Bonaire in drydock at Willemsoord in 2018

=== The colonial navy and the Aceh War ===
In the 1870s the navy in the Dutch East Indies consisted of an auxiliary squadron of four ships from the Netherlands, and the colonial navy of 22 ships. The auxiliary squadron was primarily responsible for external defense. The ships of the colonial navy (Indische Militaire Marine) were meant for transport and flotilla services. All the ships were steam ships, with half still using paddle propulsion, and half using screw propulsion. The ships of the colonial navy were scattered over a wide number of stations. The tasks of the colonial navy were: fighting piracy; executing and supporting military actions; showing the flag; hydrographic work; training crews.

The Aceh War that started in 1873, created an extra demand for ships that left many of the stations in the east of the archipelago practically empty. In the Second Aceh Expedition the navy played an essential role. It roughly had five tasks: blockading the coast of Aceh; supporting landing operations; transporting men and equipment of the expedition force; executing all kinds of communication services; executing punitive expeditions on the coast. The state of the naval forces that executed these tasks was not at all good. The steam ships had numerous deficiencies, especially leaky boilers.

=== Reaction to the Aceh War ===
In late April 1873 there was a debate about the situation in Aceh in the Dutch house of representatives. The measures to redress the situation of the navy consisted of sending more ships, pressing the construction of four fourth-class screw ships, (which left for the Indies later that year)) and building new ships. A budget law to change the Dutch East Indies budget reserved 1,400,000 guilders for four steamships 4th class; 720,000 for two iron paddle steamers and 200,000 for ten steam launches. While Isaäc Dignus Fransen van de Putte was naval minister a.i. (18 December 1873 – 16 May 1874), four more steam ships fourth class, meant for the East Indies, were laid down and more paddle ships were started. These four fourth-class steamships arrived circa September 1874. The gunboats laid down during the ministry of Fransen van de Putte were the ships of the Pontianak class.

In May 1875 the government ordered the first three ships of the Samarang class at private shipyards. In August 1875 these received their names. Makassar was still named Suriname, and ordered for the navy, instead of for the department of the colonies. The need for these kind of ships in the Dutch East Indies made that Suriname was transferred to the colonial navy before she was finished, and was renamed 'Makassar'. A new Suriname was then ordered from the Koninklijke Fabriek.

== Characteristics ==
=== Design ===
With regard to size the class was somewhat larger than the preceding classes of screw steam ships built for the colonial navy. Overall the size resembled that of the Vesuvius class of sloops. The big innovation that came with the class was that it was made of iron with a cover of wood and zinc. It was a further evolution of the previous classes that had been composite ships, which had a wrought iron frame with wooden planking.

=== Machinery ===
The machines of the class had a nominal power of 100 hp. They were high pressure steam engines with expansion valves and surface condensers. All below the waterline. The machinery, boilers and screws of Samarang, Batavia, Makassar and Bonaire were identical. Suriname and Padang had the same machinery and screw, but boilers that were 0.25 m (9.8 in) longer.

On 21 May 1878 Suriname underwent her trials with Captain-lt J.C. Creeve, the inspector of the steam engine service Captain van Alphen, and the chief engineer of ship construction Beelo. With 60 pounds steam pressure and 113 revolutions a minute the ship made 9.4 knots (17.4 km/h; 10.8 mph). The Samarang would make 10 knots on her trials, developing 460 ihp and 120 revolutions a minute. Both speeds are significantly higher than would be reached in service, because the ships were not fully loaded on trials.

=== Sails ===
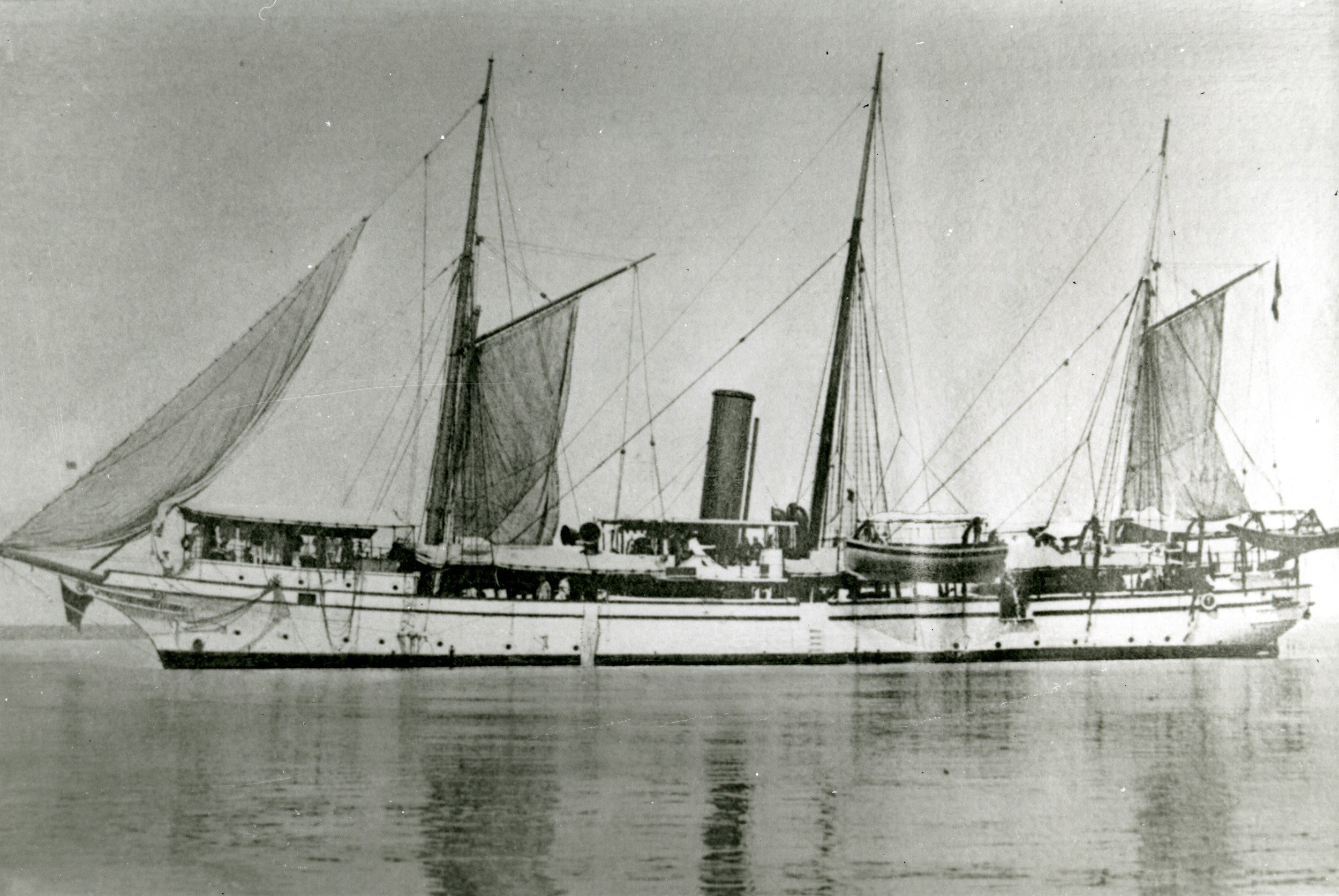
Screw gunvessel HNLMS Makassar (1877–1893) Cf the topmast

Originally the class was designed for a schooner sail plan, but this was later changed to a barquentine sail plan. The total surface of the sails of the Samarang on a close-hauled point of sail was 839.5 square meters. In 1876 the Samarang sailed at beam reach (point of sail) in a fresh breeze (in Dutch: a stijve marszeils koelte, 5 bft) and reached 8.25 knots.

The topmast of all ships that followed the Samarang was 2.25 m (89 in) shorter, which greatly influenced the surface of their sails. Indeed the designed sail-surface of the Bonaire at a close-hauled course was 745.5 m (29,350 in), and that of the Benkoelen 742.5 m (29,230 in). The Java and Benkoelen also has a steel mizzen-mast that was placed 0.9 m (35 in) more aft.

=== Armament ===
Samarang, Batavia and Makassar started out with 1 RML 7-inch Armstrong Gun and 2 * 12 cm K.A. Padang, Bonaire and Suriname started out with 1 15 cm A No. 1 and 2 * 12 cm breechloader. Tideman had Samarang and Batavia with one 15 cm breech loader and three 12 cm breech loaders, but this is probably a mistake.

== Ships in the class ==
Of the six ships three were built by the Koninklijke Fabriek van Stoom- en andere Werktuigen and three, Samarang, Bonaire and Padang by Fijenoord. Makassar was also known as Macassar, or Macasser, especially in official sources. However, the name did refer to the city Makassar, which was already generally known by its current spelling Makassar at the time. Also note that more ships might have been built to the model of the Samarang class.

That Suriname (not the ship that was renamed to Makassar) and probably also Bonaire and Padang were also part of this class can be derived from Tideman's work. He states the machinery of all these ships to be equal (cf above), and in Livret D almost all other aspects are noted to be the same, except for the armament which might have differed sightly (cf above).

Also note that there was a kind of naming convention. The ships paid by the department of the colonies, and employed there as part of the 'Indische Militaire Marine' have names referring to the archipelago. Suriname and Bonaire, as well as later St. Eustatius refer to Dutch possessions in the West Indies. It explains the name change of the Suriname to Makassar.

Name	Laid down	Launched	Commissioned	Fate	Principal
Samarang		6 July 1876	16 October 1876	Finally sold 29 September 1894.	Indies Military Navy
Batavia		7 October 1876	16 February 1877		Indies Military Navy
Makassar (ex-Suriname)		17 Feb 1877	16 July 1877	1893	Indies Military Navy
Bonaire		12 May 1877	1 May 1880	Museum ship at Willemsoord, Den Helder	Royal Netherlands Navy
Suriname		27 October 1877	15 May 1878 (delivered)		Royal Netherlands Navy
Padang		24 August 1878	16 November 1878	3 August 1896 sold	Indies Military Navy

Later three more ships with horizontal compound engines according to Sells' system were built. These were the Benkoelen, Madura and Bali. The Bali (under the name St. Eustatius) was built at Fijenoord and was launched first, but commissioned after the other two. The order for the Madura and Benkoelen, both for the colonial departement was given in April 1879 to the Koninklijke Fabriek (Madura) and Fijenoord (Benkoelen). The Madura was noted to have 6 breach loaders of 12 cm.

Name	Laid down	Launched	Commissioned	Fate	Principal
Bali (ex-St Eustatius)	2 January 1878	11 November 1878	6 August 1883		Royal Netherlands Navy, later Indische Militaire Marine
Benkoelen	5 April 1879	30 October 1879	21 April 1880		Indies Military Navy
Madura		31 March 1880	30 June 1880		Indies Military Navy
