= 15 cm RK L/26 =

1860s coastal artillery gun by Krupp

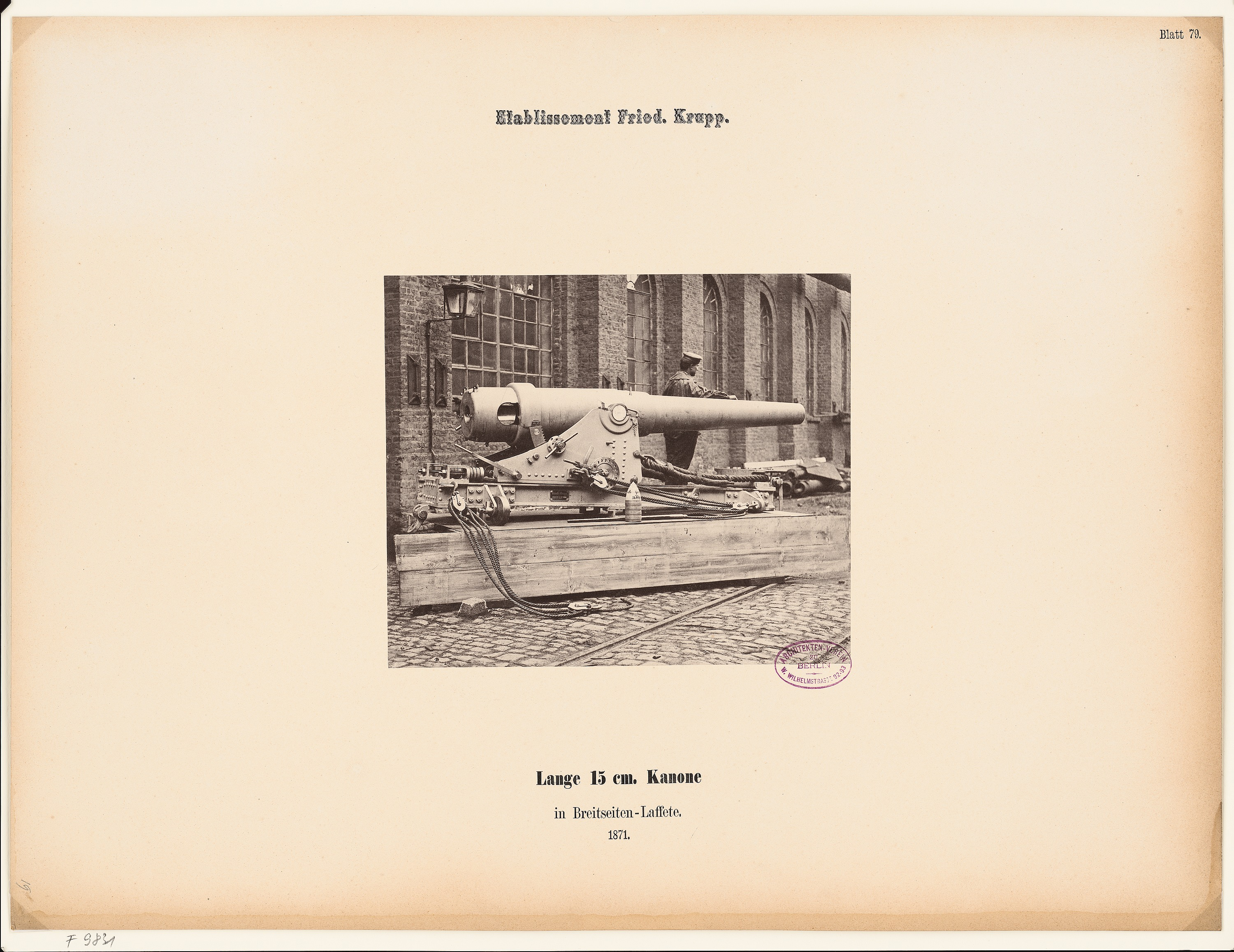
- 15 cm RK L/26 1871 model on broadside carriage
- Type: Coastal artillery
- Place of origin: Germany

Service history
- Used by: Imperial German Navy; Imperial German Army; Austria-Hungary; Ottoman Empire; Dutch navy

Production history
- Designer: Krupp
- Manufacturer: Krupp

Specifications
- Mass: 4,000 kg
- Length: 3,850 mm (L/26)
- Caliber: 149.1 mm
- Maximum firing range: 3,000 direct fire; 6,000 high angle fire

The 15 cm Ring Kanone L/26 or Lange 15 cm Ring Kanone was a 15 cm 26 caliber long Krupp Ring Kanone (RK). It was a rifled breech loader built-up gun with a Krupp cylindroprismatic sliding breech. It was designed based on the idea that for penetrating armor, it might be more effective to increase the charge then to increase the caliber. Near the end of its development, the navy and the army chose different inner configurations for their new guns, which actually led to two different guns.

== Context ==
=== A 15 cm gun for coastal defense ===
In 1858 Prussia decided that its siege and fortification artillery would consist of 9, 12, and 15 cm breechloading guns. As these would also be used for coastal defense, these iron guns were tested against armor in 1860. During the tests, the iron 15 cm gun with its 2.15 kg charge proved almost useless against the standard 114 mm ship armor of the time. In mid-April 1862, this led to a recommendation to develop a 36-pdr caliber (17 cm) gun, soon followed by calls for a 19.3 cm (48-pdr caliber) gun.

=== The 15 cm c/64 ===
The 15 cm c/64 was an ancestor of our 15 cm RK L/26 gun. The c/64 had come about because the Prussian army wanted to use the Krupp sliding wedge breech instead of Martin von Wahrendorff's "piston" breech-lock. The new breech proved itself for 9 cm iron guns, but when it was tested with iron gun barrels of 12 and 15 cm, the guns suffered severe damage. Therefore, in March 1864, orders were given to design 12 and 15 cm guns made of bronze. These were quickly tested and accepted for service in December 1864 under the designation c/64.

Meanwhile, the April 1864 Battle of Dybbøl showed that the 2.25 kg charge of the 15 cm bronze c/64 was insufficient. Therefore, in November 1864 orders were given to design a new gun made for a charge of 3 kg. This would be made possible by making it of the more expensive cast steel. This steel gun also got the c/64 designation.

The 15 cm steel c/64 came in two models. The army had the gezog. Gussstahl 24-pfdr. c/64, which was renamed to 15 cm Stahl-Kanone in 1871. The navy had its own 15 cm Stahl-Kanonen c/64. These were obviously slightly different. In 1871, the navy's gezog. Gussstahl 24-pfdr. der Marine, 61 Ztr. was renamed to 15 cm Marine Stahl-Kanone. The 15 cm c/64 fired a 34.7 kg cast iron grenade with a charge of 3 kg of regular gunpowder. The velocity of the projectile was only 279.1 m/s. This was caused by the low charge to projectile weight ratio of only 1/11.6.

=== Coastal defense in Prussia / Germany ===
In the 1860s, Prussia had three companies of 'See-Artillerie', stationed in Wilhelmshafen and Friedrichsort (near Kiel). These were part of the army, but were trained for coastal defense. In 1877, these three companies would become part of the navy.

The Franco-Prussian War showed that the German coast was practically defenseless. The fortifications branch of the army artillery tried to help with its 12 and 15 cm guns. After the war, the army decided that 5 battalions of its second foot artillery brigade would be trained in the use of the new coastal guns.

== Development ==
=== Increasing the charge ===
In 1867, the Prussian Navy ordered two 24 cm K L/20 guns for testing. These would become its first Ring Kanone, a type of built-up gun. That same year, the Artillerie Prüfungskommission (Artillery Test Commission) got the idea that instead of constantly increasing the caliber of guns, it might be more efficient to increase the charge. For this purpose it proposed that a massive cast steel barrel of 21 cm would be bored to only 15 cm. This would allow an increase of the charge to 1/3 of the projectile's weight, i.e. 11 kg instead of 3 kg. The Allgemeines Kriegs Departement did not approve the commission's proposal.

Krupp picked up the idea the idea of the Artillery Test Commission. In the Winter of 1867/68, it changed a regular 15 cm steel navy gun to be able to use a charge of 5–6 kg. Tests of this gun were very positive. Meanwhile, the Prussian Navy had a 15 cm gun with double wedge breech and a weight of 60 Zentners (3,000 kg) changed for an increased charge.

This gun was tested in Fall 1868. In detail, it was a massive cast steel breechloader of 3050 kg including the double wedge breech block. The length of bore was 2,084 mm. There were 24 grooves with a twist length of 63.2 calibers or 9.42 m.

The test firing for accuracy took place at a distance of 900 m, for penetration this distance was only 150 m. It was found that accuracy was bad if the charge to shot weight ratio rose above 1/5 or if velocity was higher than about 410 m/s. However, for penetration the results were very positive. At 150 m a 127 mm armor belt was penetrated with ease while using a 6 kg charge. With a charge of 7 kg, 6 inch armor could easily be penetrated.

The effectiveness of this test barrel against 6 inch armor with a charge of 7 kg made that it seemed advisable to equip small and medium wooden warships with this gun. However, the test barrel had not been made for the 7 kg charge. The Artillery Test Commission then made a proposal for a long 15 cm gun for a charge of 7 kg.

=== The lange Ring Kanone proposal ===
In November 1868, the Artillery Test Commission made its proposal for a long 15 cm gun for a charge of 7 kg. It proposed that it would be made stronger by using the Ring Kanone construction. In order to decrease recoil, its weight should be increased to 80 Zentner (4,000 kg). Its length should be increased from 3.27 to 3.74 m (L/25). The rifled part of the barrel should be lengthened from 14 to 18 calibers, and the twist length should be 70 calibers. The breech block should be the Krupp cylindroprismatic breech with broadwell ring.

These tests made that the long 15 cm caliber again became part of the caliber system of the Coastal defence. However, no long 15 cm guns were ordered for the coastal artillery, because the Prussian authorities hoped to be able to make these from bronze. The Prussian navy did order some guns in 1869, see below.

=== The 15 cm bronze for increased charge ===
As stated above, the German authorities hoped that a suitable 15 cm gun for increased charge could be made from bronze. This was cheaper than using the expensive Krupp cast steel. In 1869 a bronze breechloader of 3,500 kg with broadwell ring, a twist rate of 68.1 calibers and bored for a charge of 8 kg was made.

The test of this bronze gun showed that its barrel wore down quickly due to the high charge. Two more attempts to make stronger barrels were made, but these also did not lead to satisfactory results. The conclusion was that a bronze 15 cm gun for a 7 kg charge could be made. However, it would be significantly less effective than the lange 15 cm RK L/26, which was already not that powerful against armor. Therefore, bronze was found unsuitable for heavy coastal guns. In May 1872, the Allgemeines Kriegs Departement then put an end to the attempts to make a bronze 15 cm breechloader.

== The lange 15 cm Ring Kanone ==
=== The lange 15 cm Marine Ring Kanone ===
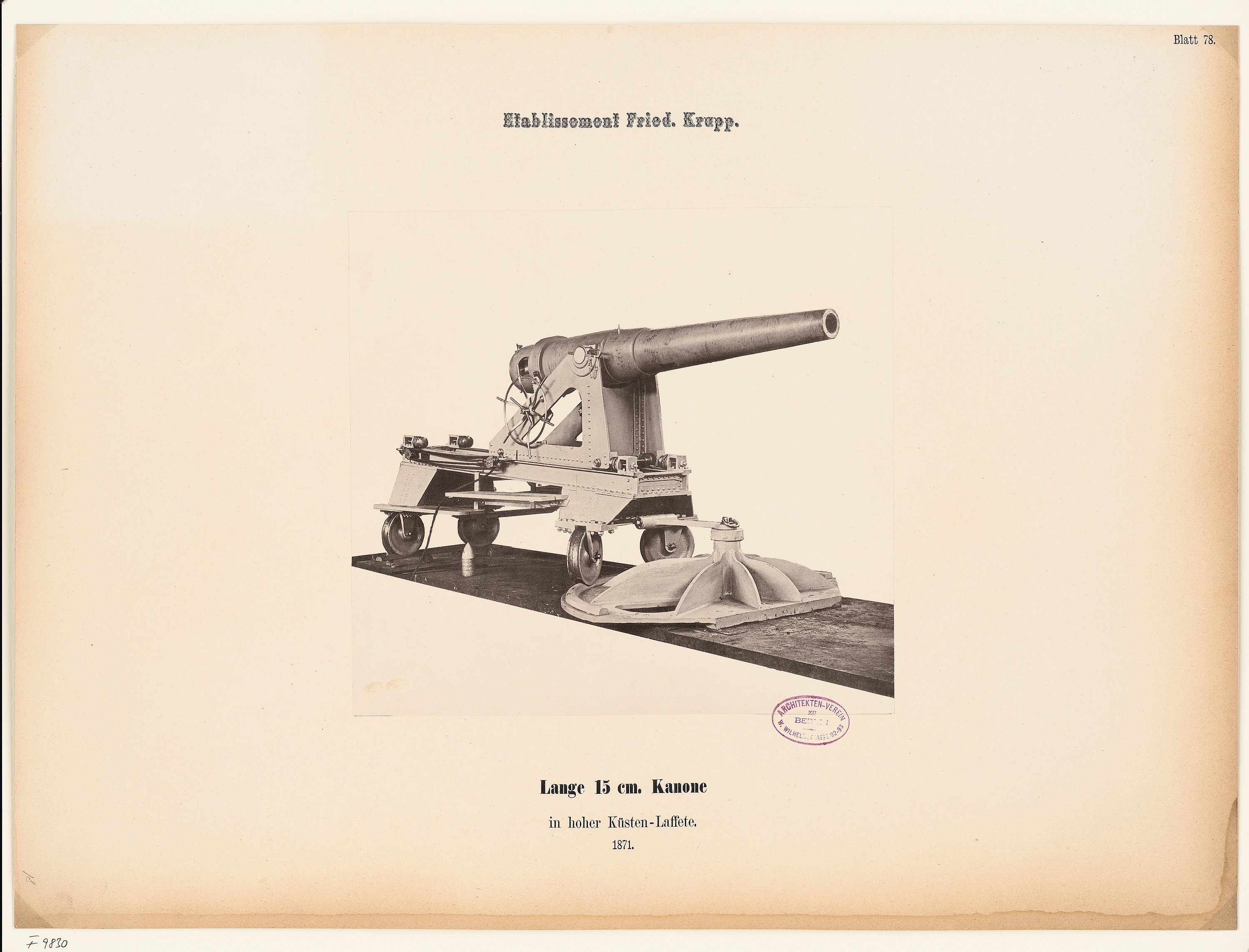
1871 version of the gun

After the November 1868 proposal of the Artillery Test Commission, the Marine Ministerium (later Kaiserliche Admiralität) ordered some guns of this model in 1869. As the name shows, these were Ring Kanone, the Krupp type of built-up gun. Up till August 1871 the name of these guns was: langer Ring 24-pfdr c/70 147.2" (80Ztr. schwer.) That month, it was changed to lange 15 cm Marine Ring Kanone. In 1885, the name lange 15 cm Ring Kanone was changed to 15 cm Ring Kanone L/26, abbreviated 15 cm RK L/26.

In 1870, these first 15 cm RK L/26s were tested. The tests showed a high velocity of 480 m/s. However, the guns were also way too inaccurate. The Franco-Prussian War then put an end to this development.

When in May 1872 the Allgemeines Kriegs Departement put an end to its attempts to get a 15 cm bronze gun, the 15 cm Ring Kanone model again got attention. This time, the Artillery Test Commission doubted whether it was economically sensible to order the 15 cm gun with its limited use against armor.

=== Testing for a new model ===
In 1872, the army did not yet have a 15 cm Ring Kanone. The Navy had some, but these had proved inaccurate and so required testing to determine the best number of grooves and the best twist rate. The Allgemeines Kriegs Departement and the Admiralty then decided on a joint approach.

In 1872, the Artillery Test Commission started experiments with two long 15 cm barrels, No. 146 and No. 147 with 70 and 65 calibers constant twist length and Keilzüge grooves. Later, a gun No. 148 with 40 calibers progressive twist length, 32 parallel grooves and built for firing projectiles with copper driving bands was added.

In October 1872 the commission reported that with projectiles with soft lead driving bands the guns were inaccurate, hard lead was better, but copper driving bands gave even better results. In the winter of 1872/73 more guns entered the tests. The hard lead driving bands of projectiles was changed in accordance with how this was done in some new field guns. This greatly increased the accuracy of projectiles with lead driving bands.

=== The army's lange 15 cm Ring Kanone ===
In March 1873, the Allgemeines Kriegs Departement decided that its lange 15 cm Ring Kanone would use hard lead driving bands for normal and chilled iron grenades. This was best served by a barrel with 24 Keilzüge and a constant twist length of 50 calibers. This inner configuration made that the army's lange 15 cm Ring Kanone with its 24 Keilzüge got the same inner configuration as the army's standard 15 cm Ring Kanone C/72.

=== The later navy's 15 cm Ring Kanone L/26 ===
The Admiralty did not opt for lead driving bands and continued testing. In Summer 1874, the Admiralty determined to use copper driving bands, three caliber long regular grenades and a constant 45 caliber long twist rate.

It is not clear what the effects of this decision were. The first navy 15 cm Ring Kanone L/26's undoubtedly had the Keilzüge that were usual when they were ordered. There is also a 1877 statement that the Küsten Artillerie der Marine had only a few long 15 cm Ring Kanone. Furthermore, in 1875 Krupp made its first Mantel Ring Kanone.

=== The Austro-Hungarian Navy long 15 cm RK ===
The Austro-Hungarian Navy ordered 43 early long 15 cm RK L/26 with a shorter twist rate. In May 1872, one of these was tested in Pola. With 8 kg of Austrian Prismatic Pulver, this shot a 34.5 kg hardened iron grenade with a velocity of 480 m/s.

The first Austrian gun was tested further in August and September 1872 and in February 1873, also in Pola. The tests took place at a distance of 1,094 m. The conclusions were: That the accuracy of the gun was very satisfactory; That soft lead driving bands were very satisfactory at velocities of 455 and 180 m/s; and that copper driving bands were a disadvantage.

== Characteristics ==
=== The gun ===
The first name of the gun was langer Ring 24-pfdr c/70 147.2" (80Ztr. schwer.) This kind of summed up most of its characteristics. The barrel of the 15 cm RK L/26 was 3,850 mm long, i.e. 147.2 Prussian inches of 2.616 cm. The length of bore was 3,430 mm. Caliber was 149.1 mm.

The weight of the barrel was 4,000 kg or 80 Zenter, including the breech block of 141.5 kg. The barrel of the gun had 24 wedge grooves. The army version had a twist rate of 50 calibers or 7.455 m. The navy gun had a twist rate of 45 calibers or 6.71 m.

=== Carriage ===
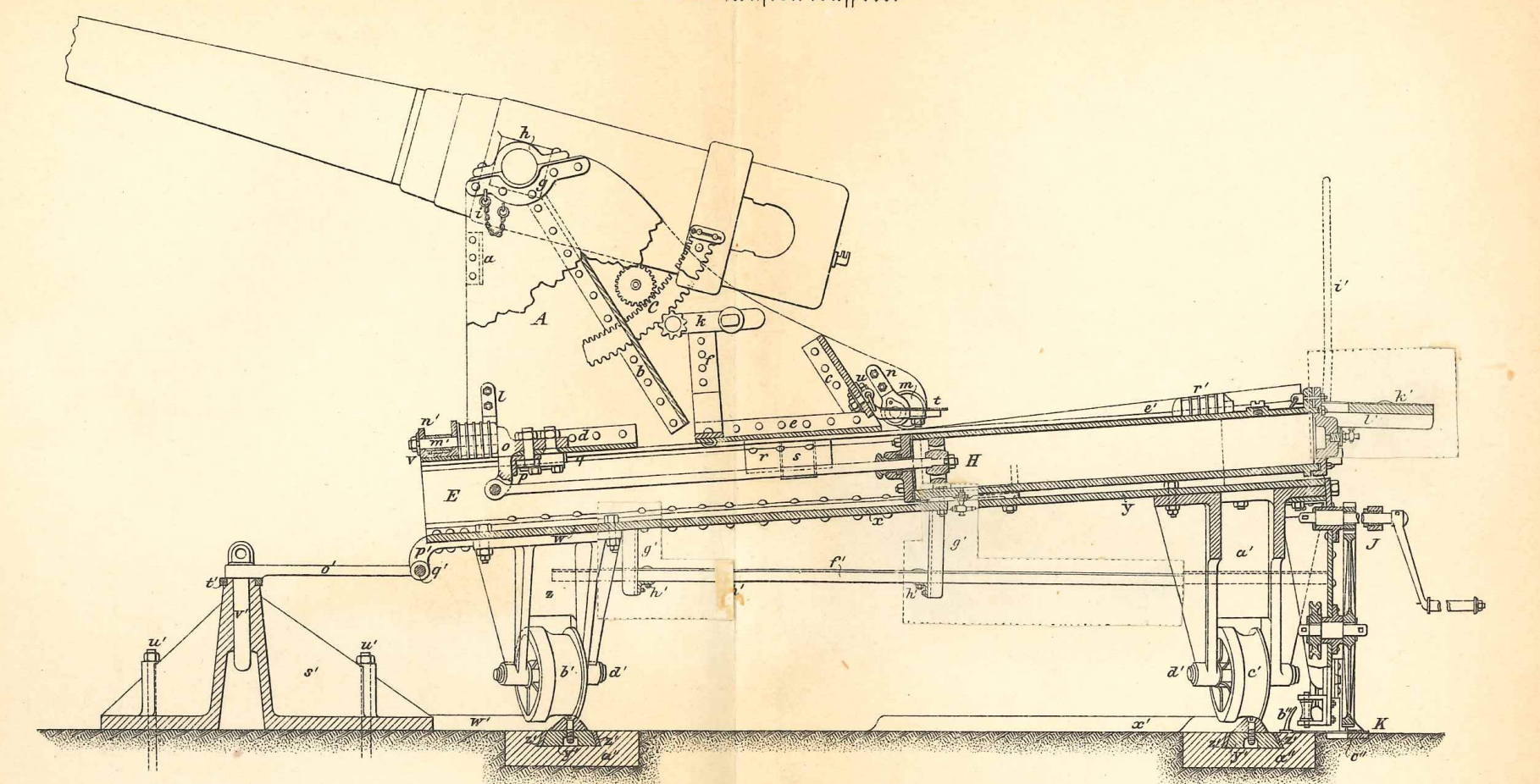
On coastal carriage

For the coastal guns, there was an aptirte Küsten-Lafette für lange 15 cm Ring Kanone with a firing height of 2,210 mm. There was also a Küsten-Lafette c/72 for lange 15 cm Ring Kanonen. The latter had a firing height of 2,320 mm. It allowed elevation to 32 degrees and declination to 5 degrees. Both were made by Gruson.

For guns on board ships, there were multiple carriages.

There was a 15 cm Mittelpivot Lafette für lange Kanonen c/70. It had a firing height of 1,170 mm and allowed elevation to 13 degrees and declination to 6 degrees. The name of the carriage suggests it was used on the upper deck of ships.

The 15 cm Rahmen-Lafette für Pfortenwechsel für lange Kanonen c/70 had a firing height of 950 mm and allowed elevation to 13 degrees and declination to 6.5 degrees. The name suggests use in a central battery ship.

For broadside use, there was a 15 cm Rahmen-Lafette c/70 für eine Pforte für lange Kanonen. It had a firing height of 965 mm and allowed elevation to 13 degrees and declination to 6.5 degrees. The name suggests Broadside (naval) or central battery use.

=== Projectiles ===
The first projectiles for the 15 cm RK L/26 were the hardened iron Hartguss Granate c/69 and the regular Langgranate c/69. The hardened iron grenade weighed 35.5 kg, was fired with a charge of 8.5 kg and attained a velocity of 495 m/s. Its effective range was 3,000 m. The Langgranate c/69 weighed 27.7 kg. It was propelled by a charge of 7 kg and attained a velocity of 500 m/s. Its effective range was 6,000 m.

The navy coastal artillery also had the Granate c/72 that was propelled by a charge of 7 kg. It had hard lead driving bands. The navy also had a 15 cm Schrapnel c/72.

The navy coastal artillery also had a Langgranate c/75 that weighed 33 kg. It was propelled by a charge of 7 kg and attained a velocity of 470 m/s. Its effective range was 5,000 m.

== Use ==
=== The German navy ===
It is not that clear how the German navy used its 15 cm Ring Kanone L/26. We have an 1877 note that the navy used its long 15 cm Ring Kanone on the upper deck of its ships, and used the short 15 cm Ring Kanone as a broad side gun. This is in line with 1876 referrals to c/70 ship carriages for the long 15 cm Ring Kanone However, in an 1885 overview, it was not amongst the guns used on board ships. In the same overview, it was mentioned as the 15 cm RK L/26 formerly known as lange 15 cm Ring Kanone under the 'Gezogene und glatte Geschützrohre der Marine-Küsten-Artillerie'.

The Marine-Küsten-Artillerie is probably the same as the regiment of 'See-Artillerie' mentioned above, the only coastal artillery that the navy had. In 1877, the Küsten Artillerie der Marine had only a few long 15 cm Ring Kanone. These were either mounted on changed carriages of the old massive 21 cm guns or on Gruson carriages. The three kinds of projectiles available for the 15 cm RK L/26 that the above overview mentioned were: the grenade c/72 and the shrapnel c/72 (both with lead driving bands) and the grenade c/75 which did not have these. So it seems as if the navy had both kinds of gun in its inventory, which could have been caused by the See-Artillerie receiving the army model before it became part of the navy in 1877, or by it receiving the early model navy guns.

=== The German army ===
As mentioned above, the Prussian army had to operate most of the coastal artillery in the years when the 15 cm RK L/26 came into service. In 1875, a large number of these Lange 15 cm Ring Kanone were ordered. However, the gun soon proved almost useless against modern ships.

Therefore, a large number of Lange 15 cm Ring Kanone became available for the army in 1876. In an elaborate 1877 description of the Lange 15 cm Ring Kanone as used by the Prussian Army, it was indeed mentioned as also in use with the Landartillerie.

It was also mentioned as used by the siege artillery (Belagerungsartillerie). However, as the guns required a solid underground with rails to move sisdeways and a pivot, it could only be used in fixed positions. The army therefore used the lange 15 cm Ring Kanone some of the major fortresses.

=== The Austro-Hungarian navy ===
The Austro-Hungarian Navy had at least 43 15 cm RK L/26. While the barrel itself was almost the same, the number and kind of grooves of the Austrian gun was different. The Austro-Hungarian screw frigate SMS Radetzky had the 15 cm RK L/26 gun.

=== The Dutch navy ===
The Dutch navy used the 15 cm RK L/26 as '15 cm A No. 1'. It weighed 4,000 kg including a breech block of 147.5 kg. Its length was 3,850 mm, length of bore was 3,430 mm, and caliber 149.1 mm. The gun had 36 grooves with a twist length of 45 calibers. The grooves were 0.95 cm wide and 0.15 cm deep, the lands were 0.35 cm wide.

In the early 1890s, the '15 cm A No. 1' was used on the sloop Alkmaar, the Samarang-class gunvessels Suriname and Bonaire, and the corvette Sommelsdijk.

=== Turkey ===
In 1873 Turkey ordered 230 Long and 50 short 15 cm guns. Based on the year of the order and the label 'long' the long guns of the order refer to the 15 cm RK L/26 model. Later, the gun indeed shows up on multiple photos.

=== Denmark ===
Denmark had the 15 cm RK L/26, which it labelled 15m.

=== Norway ===
Norway had the 15 cm RK L/26.
