= HNLMS Bonaire =

Samarang-class gunvessel of the Netherlands

Coordinates: 52.961079°N 4.770046°E

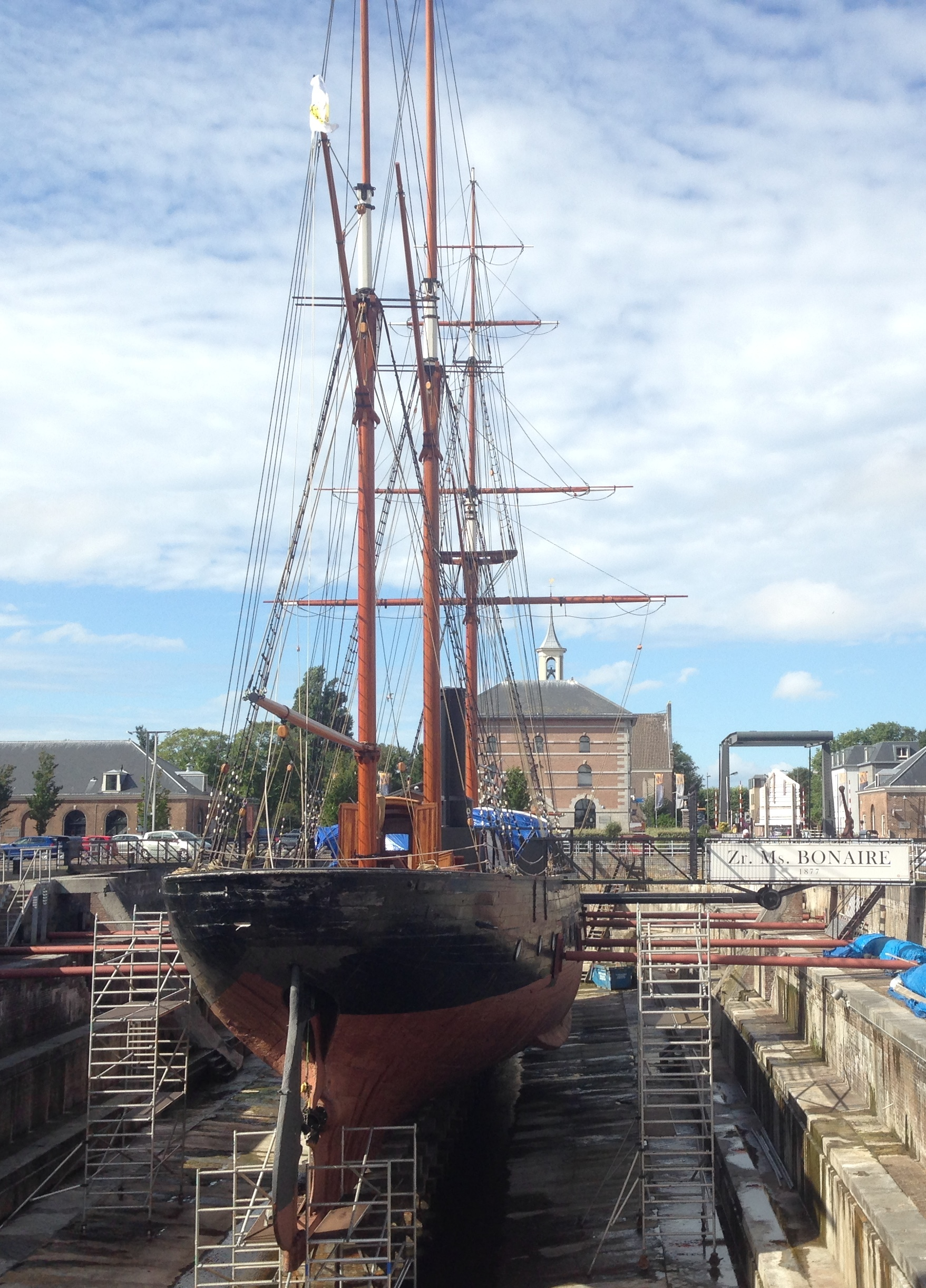
- Bonaire in drydock, 2018

History

Netherlands
- Name: HNLMS Bonaire
- Launched: 12 May 1877
- Commissioned: 1877
- Decommissioned: 1995
- Renamed: Abel Tasman, 1924
- Status: Under restoration as museum ship

General characteristics
- Class & type: Samarang-class gunvessel
- Tonnage: 837 long tons deadweight (DWT)
- Length: 53 m (173 ft 11 in)
- Beam: 9 m (29 ft 6 in)
- Draught: 3.9 m (12 ft 10 in)
- Sail plan: 3-masted barquentine
- Armament: 1 * 15 cm A No. 1; 3 * 12 cm K.A. BL

HNLMS Bonaire is a Samarang-class gunvessel of the Royal Netherlands Navy, from 2005 is under restoration as a museum ship.

== History ==
Bonaire was built for the Royal Netherlands Navy as a gun vessel with barquentine rig and a retractable screw. She was launched at Rotterdam on 12 May 1877.

From 1924 she served at Delfzijl as living quarters for the Dutch Nautical College, and was renamed Abel Tasman.

After Abel Tasman lay abandoned for many years, a restoration programme began in 2005 at Den Helder to secure the future of the ship as a floating museum.

== See also ==
- HNLMS Buffel
- HNLMS Schorpioen
- Jylland
- List of museum ships
