= Obturating ring =

Ring of soft material designed to obturate under pressure

An obturating ring is a ring of relatively soft material designed to obturate under pressure to form a seal. Obturating rings are often found in artillery and other ballistics applications, and similar devices are also used in other applications such as plumbing, like the olive in a compression fitting. The term "O-ring" is sometimes used to describe this kind of pressure seal.

== Ballistics uses ==
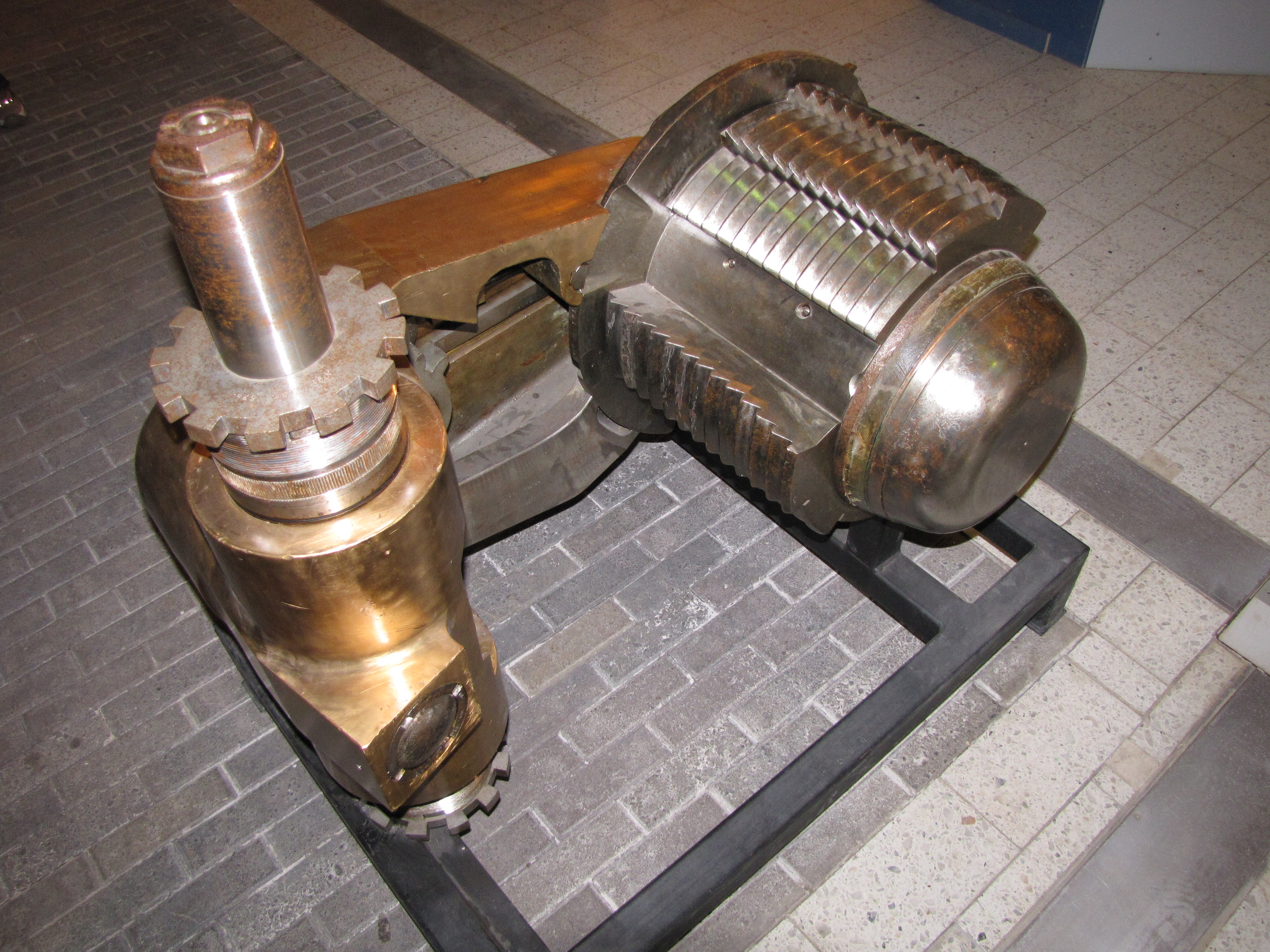
Welin screw breech block showing the protruding head of the mushroom-shaped de Bange obturator, with its obturating ring between the head and the screw

Obturating rings are common in artillery, where the steel or cast-iron casing of the shell is too hard to practically deform to provide a tight seal for the propellant gases. An obturating ring which is called driving band made of a softer material is the standard solution for that problem. Mortar bombs also use obturating rings to provide a seal around the projectile. Recoilless rifles and some artillery use rings with a reverse impression of the rifling cut in them for a tighter seal even at very low pressures.

Another obturating ring may be used on sliding/falling breech-blocks from the opposite side of the chamber to provide a tight seal there if the charge is bagged and lacks a case (examples include early Krupp guns to Royal Ordnance L11 to M777). The obturating ring provides the sealing that would normally be provided by a cartridge case.

== See also ==
- Broadwell ring
- Charles Ragon de Bange
