= Baháʼí Faith in Iceland =

The Baháʼí Faith in Iceland (Icelandic Baháʼí samfélagið á Íslandi) began with Baháʼís first visiting the Iceland in the early 20th century, and the first Icelandic Baháʼí was Hólmfríður Árnadóttir. The Baháʼí Faith was recognized as a religious community in 1966 and the first Baháʼí National Spiritual Assembly was elected in 1972. Currently there are around 400 Baháʼís in the country and 13 Baháʼí Local Spiritual Assemblies. The number of assemblies is the highest percentage, by population, in all of Europe.

== Early phase ==
The first mentions of Iceland is when ʻAbdu'l-Bahá, the son of the founder of the religion, wrote a series of letters, or tablets, to the followers of the religion in the United States and Canada in 1916–1917; these letters were compiled together in the book titled Tablets of the Divine Plan. The seventh of the tablets was the first to mention several countries in Europe including beyond where ʻAbdu'l-Bahá had visited in 1911–12. He wrote

"In brief, this world-consuming war has set such a conflagration to the hearts that no word can describe it. In all the countries of the world the longing for universal peace is taking possession of the consciousness of men. There is not a soul who does not yearn for concord and peace. A most wonderful state of receptivity is being realized.… Therefore, O ye believers of God! Show ye an effort and after this war spread ye the synopsis of the divine teachings in the British Isles, France, Germany, Austria-Hungary, Russia, Italy, Spain, Belgium, Switzerland, Norway, Sweden, Denmark, Holland, Portugal, Rumania, Serbia, Montenegro, Bulgaria, Greece, Andorra, Liechtenstein, Luxembourg, Monaco, San Marino, Balearic Isles, Corsica, Sardinia, Sicily, Crete, Malta, Iceland, Faroe Islands, Shetland Islands, Hebrides and Orkney Islands."

Following the release of these tablets a few Baháʼís began moving to or at least visiting countries across Europe. The first Baháʼí in Iceland was Amelia Collins who visited the country during a cruise in 1924. During that trip she met Hólmfríður Árnadóttir, who became the first Icelandic Baháʼí, and became good friends. Later in 1935 Martha Root visited the country for a month and with the help of Árnadóttir proclaimed the religion in the press, during lectures, and on the radio. In 1936 a Baháʼí, Nellie French, made her first visit to the country while on a trip to Norway and distributed literature. Amelia Collins continued to support the spread of the religion in Iceland as she supported the publication of the first translation of Baháʼí literature, John Esslemont's Baháʼu'lláh and the New Era, in Icelandic in 1939. By 1949 there were still just two Baháʼís in Iceland. In February 1956 the first pioneer arrived in Iceland from Canada Marguerite Allman, this pioneer, later sent word of the first native Icelander joining the religion by 1957 - her name was Erica Petursson. These first contacts with Iceland returned few visible results except for Árnadóttir becoming a Baháʼí but by 1963 there was a registered group of Baháʼís in Reykjavík including two American pioneers. In 1964 a Canadian Baháʼí visited all the members of the community including a long trek to visit Jochum Eggertson who lived several months of the year in a remote location - that land he later willed for the Baháʼí community and it became a site for a summer school and an endowment.

== Growth ==
The first Baháʼí Local Spiritual Assembly of Iceland is elected in 1965. Its members were Asgeir Einarsson, Kirsten Bonnevie, Florence Grindlay, Jessie Echevarria, Carl John Spencer, Charles Grindlay, Liesel Becker, Barbel Thinat and Nicholas Echevarria. The Baháʼí Faith was officially recognized as a religious organization by the Icelandic government on September 29, 1966, which gave it the right to legally perform marriages and other ceremonies as well as entitle it to a share of the church tax in proportion to its number of adult members. Until 1973, when Ásatrúarfélagið was founded, the Baháʼí Community was the only non-Christian religious organization in Iceland and it remained the largest such organization until 1999 when it was passed in numbers by the Buddhist Association of Iceland.

On August 16, 1967, a Baháʼí wedding took place in Árbæjarkirkja, a church belonging to the Lutheran Church of Iceland. The bride was Icelandic and the groom Italian. The officiant was Ásgeir Einarsson, the man recognized by the government as head of the group (though individual Baháʼís hold no leadership roles). Ásgeir Einarsson commented that the Church of Iceland had been more friendly to the Baháʼí community than state churches in other countries and that Bishop Sigurbjörn Einarsson had given them a "favorable and sympathetic" evaluation when they applied to the government for recognition. When word of the wedding ceremony reached the bishop, he expressed surprise that it had taken place in a Christian church and commented that he would have recommended against such an action. Suffragan bishop Sigurður Pálsson went further and suggested that the church would need to be reconsecrated before Christian ceremonies could resume in it. Bishop Sigurbjörn Einarsson disagreed, stating that the Baháʼí ceremony had been "a mistake, but not sinful action" and that the church had "not been defiled by it". In Dec 1970 Canadians Baháʼís sponsored a Victory Conference anticipating the 1972 formation of the National Assembly. At the conference 30 people enrolled in the religion, doubling the number of Baháʼís in Iceland.

Three additional local assemblies were formed in Iceland in August 1971. In September 1971, the Baháʼís of Reykjavík were the host of the North Atlantic Baháʼí Oceanic conference. Through the first half of the 1970s Iceland was the only country in Europe that has planned and systematically carried out, year by year, a program of proclamation that has taken the Faith throughout the entire country, north, south, east and west. Hands of the Cause John Robarts and Paul Haney were in attendance at the oceanic conference along with seven Continental Counsellors and some 700 Baháʼís from 35 countries. Tributes were held for Amelia Collins and Martha Root at the Einar Jónsson Museum. The conference began with a unity feast. A Baháʼí from Egypt, Abdu'l Rahim Yazdi, gave a talk recalling meeting ʻAbdu'l-Bahá. Representatives of the national leadership from 19 countries shared reports on their progress. Busloads traveled to the site of Þingvellir and meetings were held by youth nearby. A delegation of five from the conference called on the Prime Minister of Iceland Ólafur Jóhannesson. A reception was held for diplomatic representatives and notables of Iceland at the Saga Hotel. The conference ended with news of the passing of Hand of the Cause Musa Bánáni and a memorial was held. A public event closed the conference at the University of Iceland with singing and piano by Norman Bailey, Sylvia Schulman, Seals and Crofts, and Alfredo Speranza, a pianist originally from Uruguay. The Baháʼí National Spiritual Assembly of Iceland was established in 1972 with Hand of the Cause Enoch Olinga representing the Universal House of Justice at the first national convention. Its members were: Liesel Becker, Svana Einarsdottir, Barbara Thinat, Carl John Spencer, Petur Magnusson, Johannes Stefansson, Roger Lutley, Baldur Bragasson and Larry Clarke. In 1973 all members were able to travel for the international convention to elect the Universal House of Justice. In July 1975 Hand of the Cause William Sears and his wife visited Iceland and marked the anniversary of the martyrdom of the Báb followed by attending a youth conference. And later in 1975 various leaders of the Baháʼís met as a delegation with the President of Iceland as well as the Bishop of Iceland and Rev. Arelius Nielsson. The December 1977 and February 1979 Adib Taherzadeh presented workshops to Baháʼís of Iceland in his role as a Continental Counselor. In 1978 a revised translation of John Esslemont's Baháʼu'lláh and the New Era published as Baháʼu'lláh og nýi tíminn : kynning á Baháʼí trúnni by Edvard T. Jónsson. The 1979 convention noted there were nine assemblies in the country. In 1980 more than 50 Baháʼís from Iceland and the Faroe Islands gathered for a winter school at Olfusborgir. In 1981 Baháʼís from Iceland traveled to the Faroe Islands for a conference on the progress of the religion on the islands. In August 1982 following a Native American Council of Baháʼís Hand of the Cause Rúhíyyih Khanum then traveled across Canada and into Greenland and Iceland visiting civic leaders and Baháʼí communities. In February 1983 Baha'u'llah, His Life and Revelation was published, the first book on the religion to be written by an Icelandic Baháʼí (Edvard T. Jónsson), in the Icelandic language.

== Modern Community ==
Since its inception the religion has had involvement in socio-economic development beginning by giving greater freedom to women, promulgating the promotion of female education as a priority concern, and that involvement was given practical expression by creating schools, agricultural coops, and clinics. The religion entered a new phase of activity when a message of the Universal House of Justice dated 20 October 1983 was released. Baháʼís were urged to seek out ways, compatible with the Baháʼí teachings, in which they could become involved in the social and economic development of the communities in which they lived. Worldwide in 1979 there were 129 officially recognized Baháʼí socio-economic development projects. By 1987, the number of officially recognized development projects had increased to 1482. In 1984 the national assembly began a forestation project on the land of its endowment, (containing the birthplace of Matthias Jochumsson and see above in 1964.) In 1986 Baháʼí Icelandic youth published a special magazine for the International Youth Year. In 2000, Ólafur Ragnar Grímsson, then president of Iceland, his family and a delegation of about 30 Icelandic dignitaries visited the Baháʼí House of Worship in India, known as the Lotus Temple. He became the first head of state to visit the Lotus Temple during an official state visit. In November 2006, the small community of Iceland joined with twelve other faith groups and collaborative partners to form the country's first national interfaith forum. Also, Icelandic Baháʼís were among the attendees at a regional conference called for by the Universal House of Justice - this one happening in London in January 2009.

=== Demographics ===
Membership in the Baháʼí Community as a function of time

Government registration of the Baháʼí community showed 412 Baháʼís by the end of 2008. Iceland has the second most number of Baháʼís per capita in Europe at 1493 per million population, and has the most number of Baháʼí Local Spiritual Assemblies at 49 per million. The Association of Religion Data Archives (relying on World Christian Encyclopedia) estimated some 616 Baháʼís in 2005.

== See also ==
- Religion in Iceland
- History of Iceland
