= Pontianak-class gunvessel =

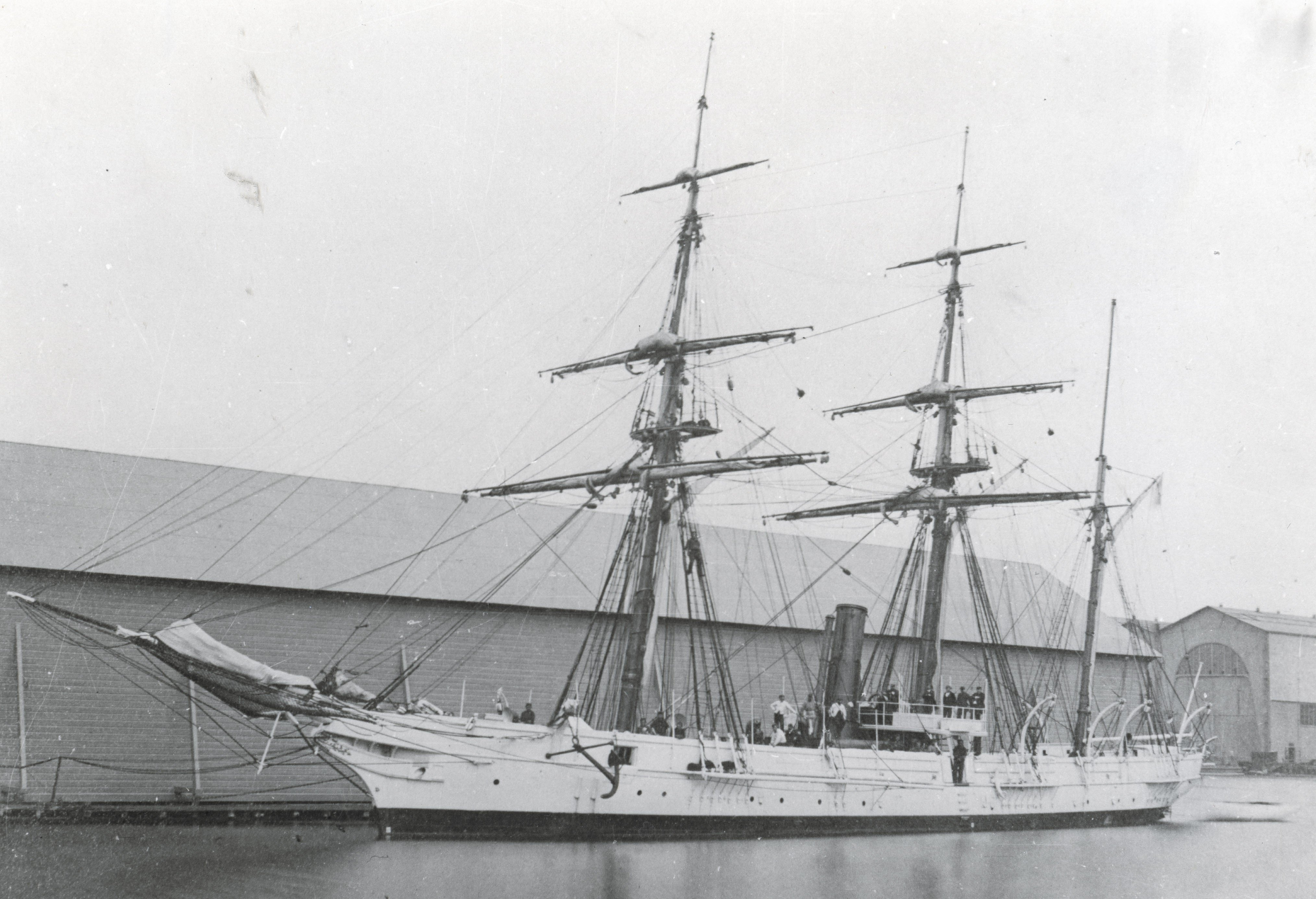
- The Pontianak

Class overview
- Name: Pontianak class
- Builders: Koinklijke Fabriek van Stoom- en andere Werktuigen, Fijenoord, Rijkswerf Amsterdam
- Operators: Royal Netherlands Navy; Indies Military Navy
- Preceded by: Riouw class
- Succeeded by: Samarang class
- Cost: 350,000 guilders
- Completed: 5
- Scrapped: 5
- Preserved: 1

General characteristics
- Type: Gunvessel
- Displacement: 732 tons
- Length: 42 m (137 ft 10 in)
- Beam: 8.80 m (28 ft 10 in)
- Draught: 3.60 m (11 ft 10 in)
- Depth of hold: 4.04 m (13 ft 3 in)
- Installed power: 90 nominal horsepower
- Speed: 8.15 knots (machines); 9.75 knots (machines trial)
- Complement: 75
- Armament: 1* RML 7-inch Armstrong Gun; 3* 12 cm BL
- Armour: none

The Pontianak class was a class of steam screw gunvessels of the Royal Netherlands Navy.

== The Dutch colonial navy in the 1870s ==
In the 1870s the navy in the Dutch East Indies consisted of an auxiliary squadron of four ships from the Netherlands, and the colonial navy of 22 ships. The auxiliary squadron was primarily responsible for external defense. The ships of the colonial navy (Indische Militaire Marine) were meant for transport and flotilla services.

In the early 1870s the demands that a war against Aceh would place upon the colonial navy were severely underestimated. When the Aceh War actually erupted in 1873, its ships proved to be too defective and too few in number. The result was that an effective blockade and communications with the landing forces could not be maintained. The Dutch reacted by ordering crash construction of new ships.

=== Ordering ===
The ordering of the Pontianak class can be traced rather accurately. In May 1873 a budget law was proposed to increase the 1873 budget for the Dutch East Indies budget by 5.5 million guilders. Of this increase 1,400,000 guilders were meant for four steamships 4th class; 720,000 for two iron paddle steamers and 200,000 for ten steam launches. In a longer comment on the budget change, the government noted that the ships of the Indische Militaire Marine were made out of oak, and therefore not suitable for long service in the tropics. Due to extensive usage the number of seaworthy ships of that navy would soon be reduced to only 5: Borneo, Sumatra, Banka, Timor and Soerabaija. The four composite built ships of the Riouw type and the Sumatara steam paddle vessel would leave for the Indies in 1873. However, the 5 ships present also needed urgent maintenance to prevent them getting irreparably damaged by use. Therefore, four more ships of the Riouw type (the Pontianak class) and one extra steam paddle vessel type Sumatra were required. In return the construction of one screw steamship 3rd class type Reteh would be cancelled. The construction, equipping and sending of these ships would take at least 12–14 months and therefore could not be delayed.

The government also said that: Naval officers and ship building engineers agreed that the improved screw steam ships fourth class were an excellent type of ship for the tasks of the Indische Militaire Marine. As regards spaciousness and ventilation they did not suffer from the defects of the old steam ships fourth class, and offered the officers and men lodgings suitable to the Indian climate. They had the required steam power for regular service. Their new armament gave them more than enough fire power for the East Indies navy. They were especially recommended for 'station duty' (stationsdienst, many outposts had a ship posted in place for a long time) because of their moderate coal consumption. Their sail plan and hull made them excellent cruisers (cf. below for the contrary), giving occasion to train the crews. For the service these ships were just as useful as the screw steam ships third class, but they required less men. A good reason to prefer these screw steam ships fourth class at a time when recruiting became ever more difficult.

Indeed, the ships of the Pontianak class were laid down a few months later. In retrospective there was a comment that while Isaäc Dignus Fransen van de Putte was naval minister a.i. (18 December 1873 – 16 May 1874), four more steam ships fourth class, meant for the East Indies, were laid down and more paddle ships were started. These four fourth-class steamships arrived about the month September 1874. It can be asserted below that the four screw steam ships arriving in the Indies about September 1874 indeed were four ships of the Pontianak class. These had been launched, (not laid down) during the ministry of Fransen van de Putte.

The Aruba was ordered at a different date than the other ships of the Pontianak class. She had the same dimensions, displacement and nominal power as the rest of the class, but she was built for the Dutch navy. However, in all probability she was the original design of the Pontianak class. In the May 1874 'final' budget for the navy the minister stated: The ships of the 3rd and 4th class are to be built like the Alkmaar and Aruba according to the composite system.

== Characteristics ==
=== Requirements ===
The ships of the Pontiak class were to join in executing the five tasks of the navy during the Aceh war. These were: blockading the coast of Aceh; supporting landing operations; transporting men and equipment of the expedition force; executing all kinds of communication services; executing punitive expeditions on the coast.

The Pontianaks had to have enough machine power to catch blockade runners. They also needed some long range guns for the same purpose, and to attack the coast. Transporting men and equipment meant that they had to have sufficient cargo space. All this did not imply that anything elegant would be constructed. The requirement that the draught should not be more than 3.5 m gave even less freedom to design.

=== Dimensions ===
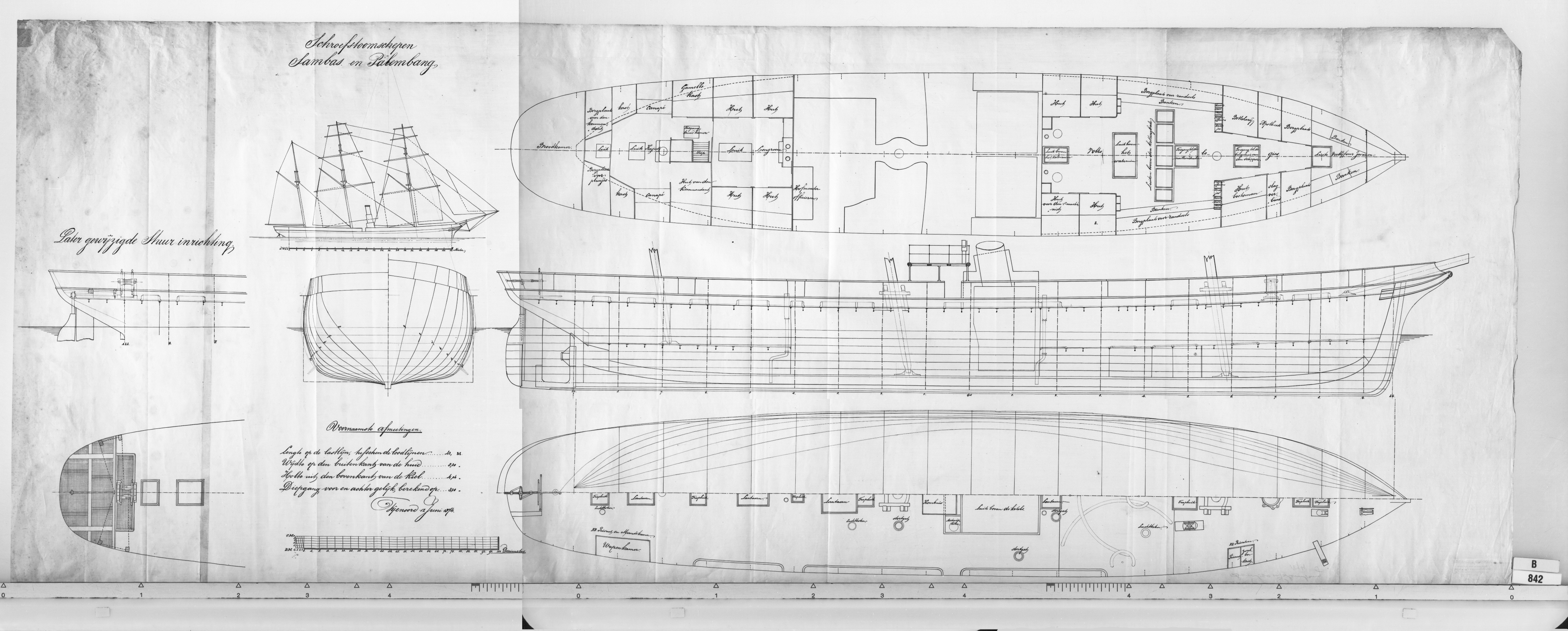
Design of Palembang and Sambas June 1874

The Pontianaks were composite built, i.e. they had a wrought iron frame with wooden planking. They had a displacement of 732 tons. It made them of the size of the Vesuvius-class sloops which displaced 759 tons and preceded them by 15 years. The big difference was in the propulsion. While the Vesuvius was a class of sailing ships with auxiliary power, the Pontianaks were ships with full power which happened to have sails. The Vesuvius class had length * beam * draught 45.5 * 9.2 * 4.3 m, the Pontianaks 42.0 * 8.8 * 3.6 m. In other words, the Vesuvius class was much longer, wider and deeper than the Pontianaks, and yet displacement was almost the same. It reflects Tideman's note that the requirement that the ships should draw more than 3.5 m of water made the lines of the ships 'somewhat fuller than would otherwise have been desirable'. It also meant they had only bilge keels, not a regular keel. On their first trip the seaworthiness of the Sambas and Palembang was reported as far from desirable. Both ships had broken the chain for the rudder, and one of them had a very leaky upper deck. They were also reported to pitch heavily.

=== Propulsion ===
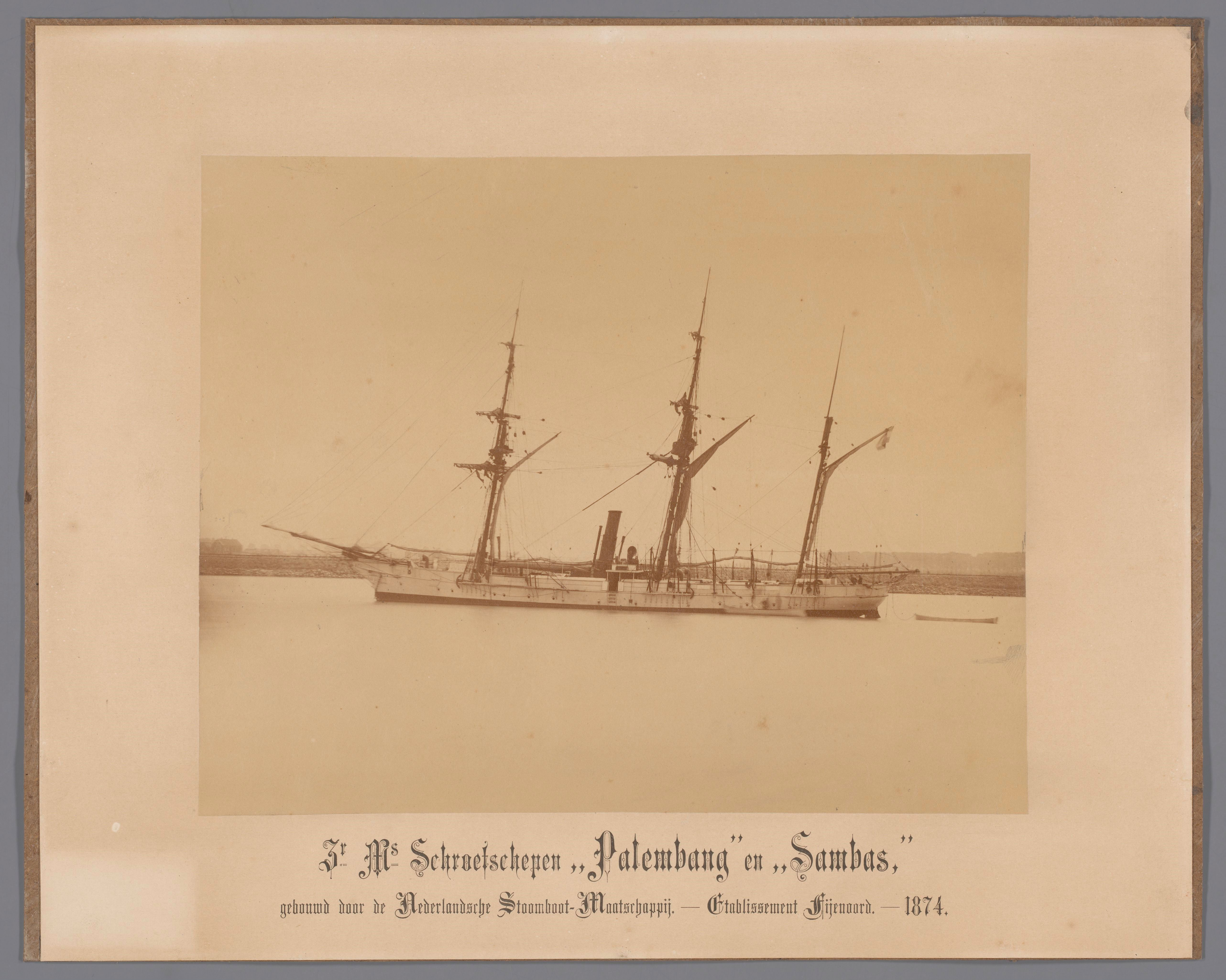
Photo titled Palembang and Sambas

==== Machinery ====
It's reasonable to assert whether the machines of the class were about equal. The Sambas was said to get machines of 90 hp. The same was also said about the Palembang. The Bandjermasin was said to have machines of 300 ihp. The Aruba was reported to have machines of nominal 90 hp and 350 ihp.

On its trial run the Aruba made 9.75 knots at 123 turns. Exactly the same was said of the trials of the Bandjermasin. In all probability one of these statements is false.

==== Sailing ====
Sambas and Palembang were said to pitch heavily. The Bandjermasin was said to sail only reasonably. The sailing characteristics of the Aruba were noted as: sails badly, rolls heavily, takes much water due to heavy sail plan and rigging, and has a heavy weather helm. The absence of a keel, and the 'rather full lines' mentioned above offer a logical explanation for the sailing characteristics.

=== Armament ===
The Bandjermasin and Pontianank each had a rifled muzzle loading gun of 18 cm and two 12 cm breach loaders. The Aruba had the same armament. Palembang and Sambas were also said to have an 18 cm gun.

== Ships in the class ==
=== Construction ===
Name	Laid down	Launched	Commissioned	Fate	Principal	Built by
Pontianak	29 July 1873	20 December 1873	25 May 1874	Sold 18 April 1898	Indies Military Navy	Koninklijke Fabriek
Aruba		30 December 1873	16 January 1876		Royal Netherlands Navy	Rijkswerf Amsterdam
Sambas	12 July 1873	24 January 1874	10 May 1874	Sold 1896	Indies Military Navy	Fijenoord
Palembang	5 August 1873	3 March 1874	16 June 1874	Sold 1888	Indies Military Navy	Fijenoord
Bandjermasin	29 July 1873	7 March 1874	16 June 1874	Sold 29 September 1894	Indies Military Navy	Koninklijke Fabriek

=== Arrival in the Indies ===
The Pontianak and Bandjermasin arrived at Aceh, East Indies on 11 September 1874 On their way to Aceh the Palembang and Sambas reached Galle on Sri Lanka on 30 September 1874. On 14 October 1874 the Palembang and Sambas were reported to have arrived at Aceh.
