= Krupp gun =

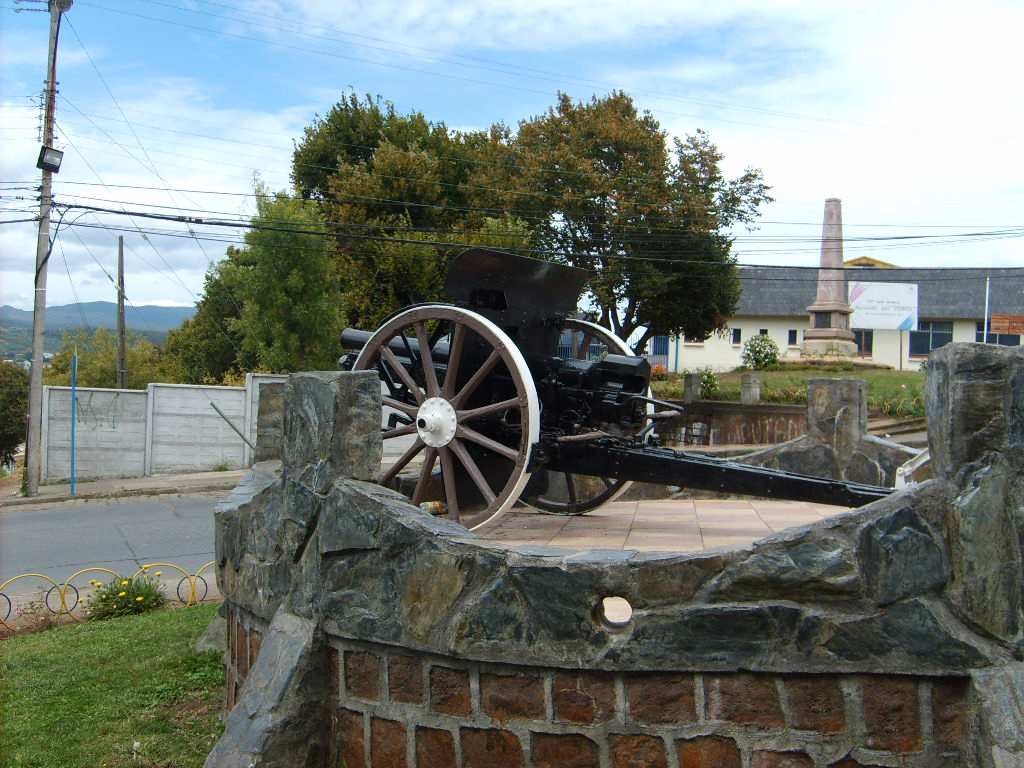
- A 75mm Krupp gun used during the War of the Pacific
- Type: Artillery
- Place of origin: Kingdom of Prussia; German Empire

Service history
- In service: c.1860 – c.1938
- Used by: See § Users
- Wars: Franco-Prussian War; War of the Pacific; Mahdist War; Philippine Revolution; First Sino-Japanese War; Second Sino-Japanese War; Spanish–American War; Second Boer War; Russo-Japanese War; Mexican Revolution; Philippine–American War; First Balkan War; World War I; Spanish Civil War; Donghak Peasant Revolution; Contestado War

The Krupp gun is a family of artillery pieces that was used by several world armies from the nineteenth century onwards.

== History ==
In 1811, Friedrich Krupp founded his cast-steel factory Gusstahlfabrik, but it was his son, Alfred Krupp, who attained notable success.

The principal characteristic of Krupp guns was that they were made of steel at the time when everyone else still used bronze, cast iron and sometimes wrought iron. Alfred Krupp was introduced to the Bessemer process to mass-produce steel by his London agent and friend, Alfred Longsdon, in 1859–60. After a lengthy period of trial and error, this steel was developed to such quality that the royal factory of Woolwich in England acquired steel from Krupp to manufacture guns that conformed to British naval standards.

Also, Krupp was one of the first manufacturers to design practical breechloading guns for army use. In 1856, Fried. Krupp A.G., produced a 9 cm (6-Pfünder-Feldkanone C/61) rifled breechloader of cast steel with a "piston" breech-lock designed by Martin von Wahrendorff, which gave such good results that Prussia adopted steel for making army guns, which made Prussia the first country to do so.

Initially during the 1850s, Krupp developed a breechloading system with a sliding wedge breech block, but, because of problems with escape of gas, it continued to manufacture Wahrendorff breeches until they were able to copy the Broadwell ring design, and that allowed the problem to be solved. The inventor, American engineer Lewis Wells Broadwell (who worked as a sales agent for the Gatling Gun Company in Europe), was not able to enforce his patents in Prussia or get any money from Krupp (which was not unusual for Germany at the time, then-notorious for foreign patent violation). By this means, they developed the best breechloading guns of the time, assisted by Longsdon's patented designs.

Breech closure was achieved by a steel wedge that slid transversely on a short groove at the rear part of the gun. The movement was imparted by a screw mechanism and the gas-check by the Broadwell ring system.

Krupp guns were purchased by the Russian, Austrian, and the Ottoman Empire armies during the 1860s. After they were successfully used by the Germans during the Franco-Prussian War of 1870, foreign customers from all over the world began importing guns from Krupp. Naval guns were also rapidly developed; from 1863, guns were being manufactured for several navies, which included those of Austria-Hungary, Empire of Japan, the Ottoman Empire and Prussia, among others.

Krupp also copied the built-up gun invented by John Ericsson and patented by Blakely and Armstrong to manufacture larger artillery pieces.

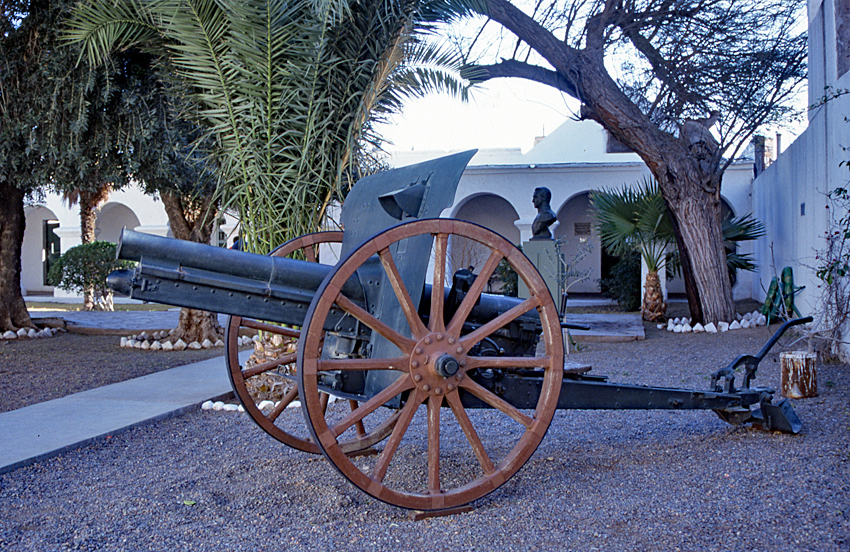
Krupp 75mm L30 M1909 field gun in San Juan, Argentina

By the 1880s, Krupp had developed an 88mm naval gun and adopted 75mm as the caliber for the army's field and mountain guns. In 1897, when the French 75mm quick-firing gun appeared, Krupp produced the similar 77mm, which was used in World War I.

Krupp mountain guns were also used during the Mexican Revolution and the Spanish Civil War.

Krupp guns were used by the Kingdom of Greece and the Ottoman Empire in the First Balkan War.

Since 1948, according to military sources, the Honduran Navy has maintained one Krupp cannon, which is the first of its kind made by the company and still in working order, at the Amapala Naval Base on the Pacific coast.

== Caliber ==
At first, the caliber of the Krupp guns was determined by the weight of the projectile in pounds, but, in the 1860s, they began to designate caliber by the diameter of the bore in centimeters or millimeters.

The principal guns between the 1860s and the 1880s were:

Designation	Caliber (cm)	Weight of barrel (kg)	Weight of projectile (kg)	Maximum range (m)	Muzzle velocity (m/s)
mountain	6	107	2.14	2,500	300
field	7.5		4.3	4,600	465
mountain	7.5	100	4.3	3,000	294
field	7.85	290	4.3	3,000	357
field	8.7		6.8	4,800	465
naval	17	6,000	54.5	4,800	460
coastal	21	9,700	99	3,800	430
naval	24	17,700	160	6,000	582
naval	26	27,700	275		530
naval	30.48	32,000	329		500

== Users ==
- Argentina
- Austria-Hungary
- Belgium
- Bolivia
- Brazil
- Chile
- Costa Rica
- Denmark
- Khedivate of Egypt
- German Empire
- Kingdom of Greece
- Honduras
- Kingdom of Italy
- Empire of Japan – Also locally produced copies
- Korean Empire
- Mexico
- Morocco
- Orange Free State
- Ottoman Empire
- Paraguay
- Peru
- First Philippine Republic
- Kingdom of Prussia
- Qing Empire
- Russian Empire
- Siam
- South African Republic
- Spain
- Venezuela

== See also ==
- Krupp
- C64 (field gun)
- Krupp 7.5 cm Model 1903
