= Hólmfríður Árnadóttir =

Icelandic writer and teacher

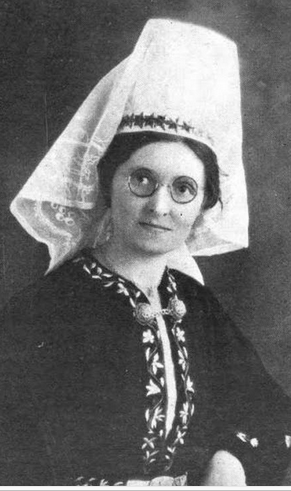
- Hólmfríður Árnadóttir wearing traditional Icelandic garb, from a 1919 publication.
- Born: February 1, 1873; Kálfsstaðir, Hjaltadalur
- Died: November 25, 1955 (aged 82); Reykjavík
- Occupations: Writer, teacher, translator
- Known for: First Baha'i convert in Iceland

Hólmfríður Árnadóttir (1 February 1873 – 25 November 1955) was an Icelandic writer and teacher, and the first Bahá'i convert in Iceland.

== Early life ==
Hólmfríður was born on her father's farm at Kálfsstaðir. Her parents were Árni and Margrét.

== Career ==
Hólmfríður wrote a children's book in English, When I was a Girl in Iceland (1919), part of a series of books about childhood in different countries. The series also included Mercedes Godoy's When I was a Girl in Mexico (1919). At the time, she was living in New York, and teaching Icelandic and Danish language classes for Columbia University Extension. In 1919, she spoke at the first convention of the National Woman's Party, in Washington, D.C., one of several international speakers on the status of women in other nations.

Hólmfríður was the first Icelandic convert to the Bahá'i faith in 1924, introduced by American Bahá'i Amelia Collins. In 1925, she traveled to the United States to attend the International Council of Women meeting in Washington. She assisted the American Bahá'i teacher, Martha Root, during her visit to Iceland in 1936. In 1939, she translated Baha’u’llah and the New Era by John Esslemont into Icelandic.

== Personal life ==
Árnadóttir died in 1955, aged 82 years, in Reykjavik.
