= Yan Phou Lee =

Chinese-born 19th century author

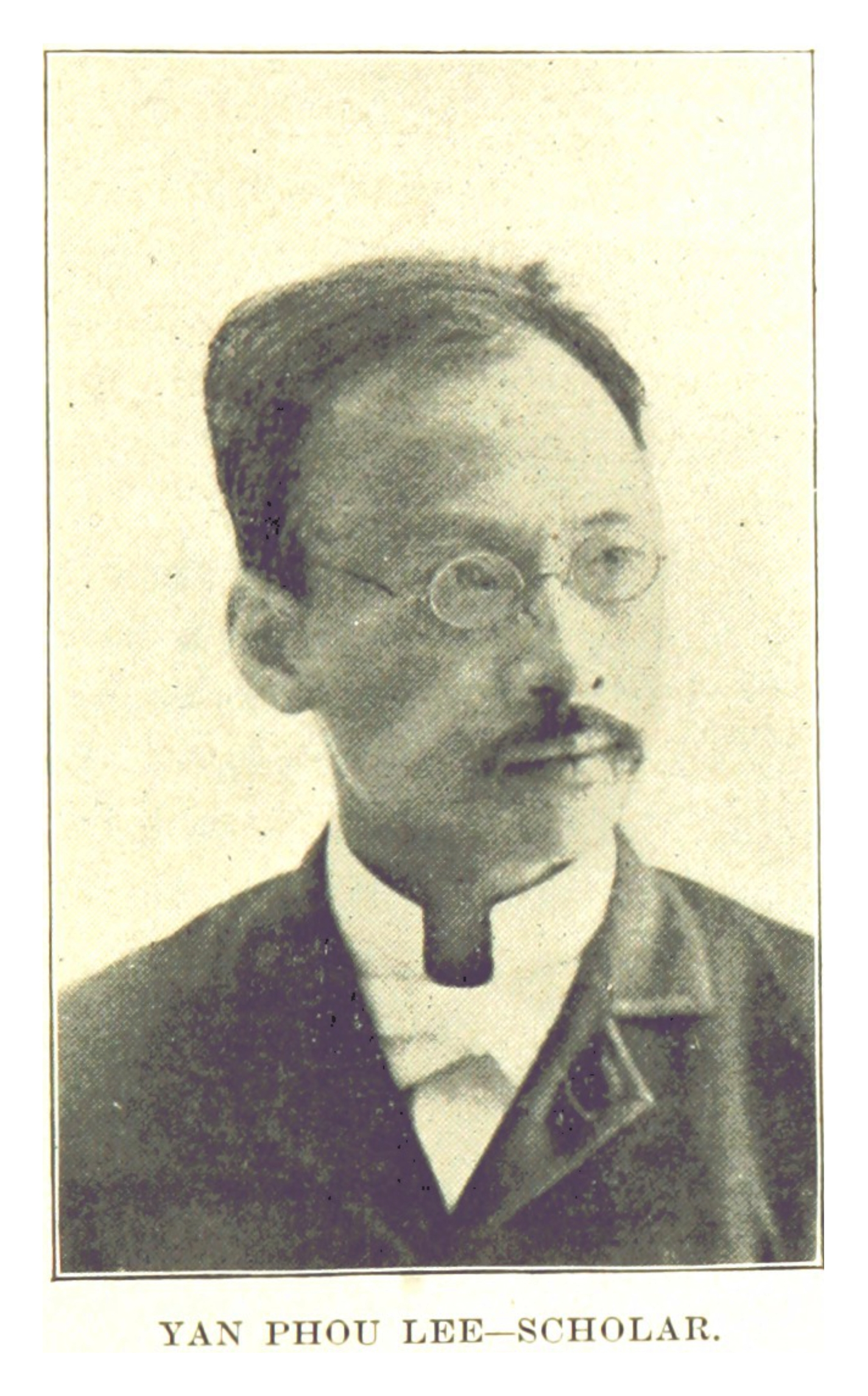
Image of Yan Phou Lee from New York's Chinatown

Yan Phou Lee (c. 1861 – c. 1938) was a Chinese-born author who was the first Asian American to publish a book in English. He graduated from Yale and published When I Was a Boy in China in 1887.

== Biography ==
Yan Phou Lee was born in 1861, in Xiangshan (Fragrant Hills), Guangdong Province. His father, who died when he was twelve, worked for a business that rented chairs for weddings. After learning about the Chinese Education Mission from his cousin, Lee's family sent him to Shanghai in order to learn English. Under government sponsorship, he sailed to San Francisco in 1873.

After entering the United States, Yan Phou Lee started his studies at Yale College in 1880, but he was forced to leave the United States by the Chinese government a year later. Lee was able to return to the United States in 1885 with the aid of Christian missionaries, and resumed his studies at Yale.

After graduating from Yale in 1887, Lee published When I Was a Boy in China, and married Elizabeth Maude Jerome. He worked various careers for a couple decades following his graduation, but he eventually received a position as the editor of the American Banker from 1918 to 1927. After resigning from his position as editor in 1927, he moved back to Guangdong. During his time back in China, he taught English and then edited for the Canton Gazette. He wrote a letter to his family and Yale class in 1938, describing the Japanese siege on Guangdong as a "inhuman, brutal, savage war." He was assumed to have died in 1938 because he did not have further contact with anyone in the United States after sending the letter.

== Speeches and written works ==
=== "The Other Side of the Chinese Question" (1887) ===
Lee graduated from Yale in 1887, and was selected to give a commencement speech. In his commencement speech, "The Other Side of the Chinese Question", Lee heavily criticized anti-Chinese sentiment among the American public. In the speech, Lee breaks down the stereotypes and accusations placed upon Chinese immigrants, and calls upon fellow Americans to speak up against racial oppression and violence.

=== "Why I am not a Heathen" (1887) ===
Influenced by the Christian teachings of preacher D.L. Moody and other Christian thinkers, Yan Phou Lee wrote "Why I am not a Heathen" in response to Wong Chin Foo's article "Why am I a Heathen?". Lee addresses Wong Chin Foo's criticisms of Christianity, primarily the issues of denominations and the abuse of Christian principles.

=== When I was a Boy in China (1887) ===
Lee became the first Asian American to publish a book in English after publishing When I was a Boy in China in 1887. The events of the book describe his childhood to an audience mostly unfamiliar with daily life and customs in China. While in many ways the book served to demystify certain perceptions of culture in China, it did not completely dismantle many prejudices against the Chinese deeply prevalent at the time. One critic wrote of When I was a Boy in China in the 1888 issue of The Saturday Review, "his book will no doubt interest many English boys who desire to know what manner of existence has fallen to the lot of their pig-tailed comrades in China."

=== "The Chinese Must Stay" (1889) ===
Following the passage of the Chinese Immigration Act, Lee penned the essay "The Chinese Must Stay".Echoing the message of his graduation speech at Yale, Lee appeals to the American ideals of equality in order to address anti-Chinese discrimination within law and society. "How far this Republic has departed from its high ideal and reversed its traditionary policy may be seen in the laws passed against the Chinese," Lee wrote.
