= Indies Military Navy =

- Indische Militaire Marine
- Active: 1868 – 1930
- Country: Kingdom of the Netherlands
- Type: Naval force
- Role: Enforce Dutch authority in the Dutch East Indies

The Indies Military Navy (Note: Also known as East Indies Marine.) (Dutch: Indische Militaire Marine. (Note: Sometimes also called in Indische oorlogsmarine); IMM) was a Dutch naval force that was permanently based in the Dutch East Indies. It was established on 16 November 1866 and operated exclusively in the waters of the colony. The navy consisted of fast small-sized warships with credible firepower that were used to enforce Dutch authority in the archipelago and to promote the general interests of the Dutch East Indies. In 1930 the IMM was disbanded.

== History ==
The Indies Military Navy (Indische Militaire Marine; IMM) was established by royal decree on 16 November 1866 by splitting the existing Dutch Squadron (Nederlands Eskader) of the Royal Netherlands Navy (RNLN). This led to most warships being transferred from the Dutch Squadron to the IMM, while the ships that remained became part of the newly formed Auxiliary Squadron (Auxiliair Eskader). Administratively the IMM was placed under the Department of the Navy in Batavia. Its ships were also paid for by the Dutch East Indies government and permanently stationed in the colony. The IMM became operational on 1 January 1868.

=== Aceh War ===
At the start of the Aceh War in 1873 most of the ships of the IMM were in poor condition.

== Personnel ==
The personnel of the IMM consisted of both Europeans and native Indonesians, with the Europeans outnumbering the Indonesians. While the European personnel came from the Royal Netherlands Navy, the native Indonesians were recruited and trained in the Dutch East Indies.

== Notes ==
=== Bibliography ===
- Backer Dirks, F.C. (1985). De Gouvernements marine in het voormalige Nederlands-Indië in haar verschillende tijdsperioden geschetst: 1861-1949 (in Dutch). Vol. I. Weesp: De Boer Maritiem. ISBN 90-228-1882-9.
- Snijders, C.J.; Kooiman, J. (1915). De Nederlandsche strijdmacht en hare mobilisatie in het jaar 1914 (in Dutch). Arnhem: Herman de Ruiter.
- Manders, M., A. van Dissel, W. Brouwers, M. Fink, J. Spoelstra, R. de Hoop, M. Heijink, A. Lemmers, A. Heitz, O. de Vroomen (2022). Wrakkentelling: Een kwantitatief onderzoek naar historische Nederlandse scheepswrakken in de wereld (PDF) (in Dutch). Amersfoort: Rijksdienst voor het Cultureel Erfgoed. ISBN 978-90-5799-348-0.
- Teitler, G.; van Dissel, A.M.C.; à Campo, J.N.F.M. (2005). Zeeroof en zeeroofbestrijding in de Indische archipel (in Dutch). Amsterdam: De Bataafsche Leeuw. ISBN 90-6707-596-5.
- Wijn, J.J.A. (1998). 'Tot in de verste uithoeken...': de cruciale rol van de Gouvernements Marine bij het vestigen van de Pax Neerlandica in de Indische Archipel 1815-1962 (in Dutch). Amsterdam: De Bataafsche Leeuw. ISBN 90-6707-434-9.
