= Broadwell ring =

The Broadwell ring is a small obturating ring used in 1860s and 1870s rifled breech loaders in Continental Europe to ensure obturation (usually in sliding wedge breechlocks). American engineer Lewis Wells Broadwell who worked as sales agent for the Gatling Gun Company in Europe replaced a papier-mache obturating cup behind the bagged charge in early bag-loaded RBLs with a metallic gas ring and patented his invention in 1861, later perfecting it in 1864 and 1866; most countries paid royalties to Broadwell for the design, but in Germany the Krupp company copied it and used it without paying.

The ring sits in a recess at the rear end of the bore, and abuts against a flat plate. When the gun is fired, the rapidly expanding gases produced by the combustion of gunpowder force the Broadwell Ring against the plate, sealing the end of the bore against escape and directing the full force of the explosion toward propelling the bullet.

The Broadwell ring is readily removed and replaced for maintenance purposes.

In late 1870s-1880s it was superseded either by a plastic obturating ring from asbestos and grease invented by Charles Ragon de Bange or drawn brass cases, when like all other metallic obturators it became more liable to damage after the introduction of smokeless powder. However, the British L11 series of 120 mm tank guns as well as some 155 mm NATO howitzers, such as the FH70, use sliding wedge breechblocks with obturating rings in order to fire their bagged ammo.
