= Linge-class tugboat =

Ship design project of the Royal Netherlands Navy

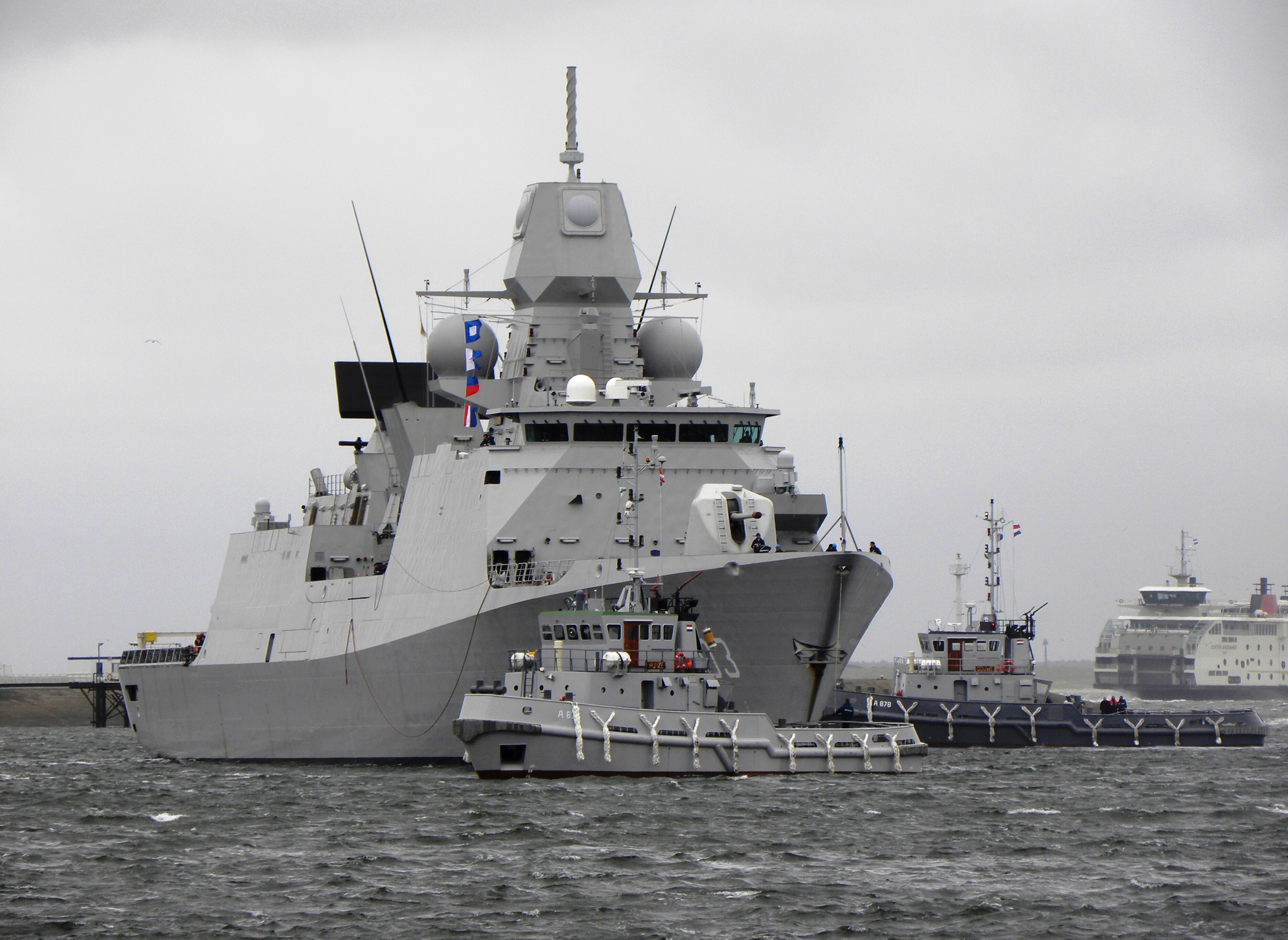
- Hunze and Gouwe towing HNLMS Tromp (centre)

Class overview
- Name: Linge class
- Builders: Shipyard Bijlsma (Hull); Delta Shipyard (Fitting out)
- Operators: Royal Netherlands Navy
- Preceded by: Westgat class
- Succeeded by: Noordzee class
- Built: 1986–1997
- In commission: 1987–present
- Planned: 5
- Completed: 5
- Active: 1

General characteristics
- Type: Tugboat
- Displacement: 200 t (200 long tons)
- Length: 27.5 m (90 ft 3 in)
- Beam: 7 m (23 ft 0 in)
- Draught: 2.3 m (7 ft 7 in)
- Propulsion: 1 propeller; 1,600 hp (1,200 kW); 2 x Stork Werkspoor diesel engines
- Speed: 11 knots (20 km/h; 13 mph)

The Linge class (Note: The class is also known in Dutch as Delta tug 2750 type.) are a series of tugboats used by the Royal Netherlands Navy to dock their larger ships at the Nieuwe Haven Naval Base.

== History ==
The first four ships were built by Shipyard Bijlsma and Delta shipyard in the Netherlands and commissioned in the year 1987. Ten years later another ship, Gouwe, was built by these shipyards and commissioned in 1997. In addition to their main purpose they are used for trips with guests around the harbour and supporting nautical training skills.

=== Replacement ===
It was decided that these ships did not provide the required bollard pull to assist the newer larger vessels like HNLMS Karel Doorman. The four oldest ships were replaced by three Damen built hybrid tugboats, the Noordzee class.

Although with the arrival of the first replacement, HNLMS Noordzee, the old tugboats did not prove completely useless when the power onboard Noordzee shut off due to contaminated fuel along the coast of North-Holland and Hunze had to assist.

The first four of these well maintained & reliable ships were sold to MTS Towage in Brixham and Falmouth in the United Kingdom.

The last linge class tugboat will be replaced, together with the tugboats of the Breezand class, by a new class of medium-sized tugboats in 2027. The new tugs are based on the EuroTug 2007 design and will be built by Neptune Marine. After entering into service of the RNLN they will be moored at Fort Harssens in Den Helder.

== Ships in class ==
Hull number	Name	Builder	Launched	Commissioned	Decommissioned	Status	Picture
A874	Linge	Shipyard Bijlsma, Warten (Hull) Delta Shipyard, Sliedrecht (Fitting out)	15 November 1986	20 February 1987	February 2016	Sold	
A875	Regge	Shipyard Bijlsma, Warten (Hull) Delta Shipyard, Sliedrecht (Fitting out)	10 January 1986	6 May 1987	February 2016	Sold	
A876	Hunze	Shipyard Bijlsma, Warten (Hull) Delta Shipyard, Sliedrecht (Fitting out)	17 December 1986	20 October 1987	February 2016	Sold	
A877	Rotte	Shipyard Bijlsma, Warten (Hull) Delta Shipyard, Sliedrecht (Fitting out)	23 June 1987	20 October 1987	February 2016	Sold	
A878	Gouwe	Shipyard Bijlsma, Warten (Hull) Delta Shipyard, Sliedrecht (Fitting out)	25 November 1996	21 February 1997		In active service	

=== Namesakes ===
All the ships are named after rivers with five letters ending with an e in The Netherlands:

- HNLMS Linge's namesake is: Linge
- HNLMS Regge's namesake is: Regge
- HNLMS Hunze's namesake is: Hunze
- HNLMS Rotte's namesake is: Rotte
- HNLMS Gouwe's namesake is: Gouwe
