= Breezand-class tugboat =

Ship design project of the Royal Netherlands Navy

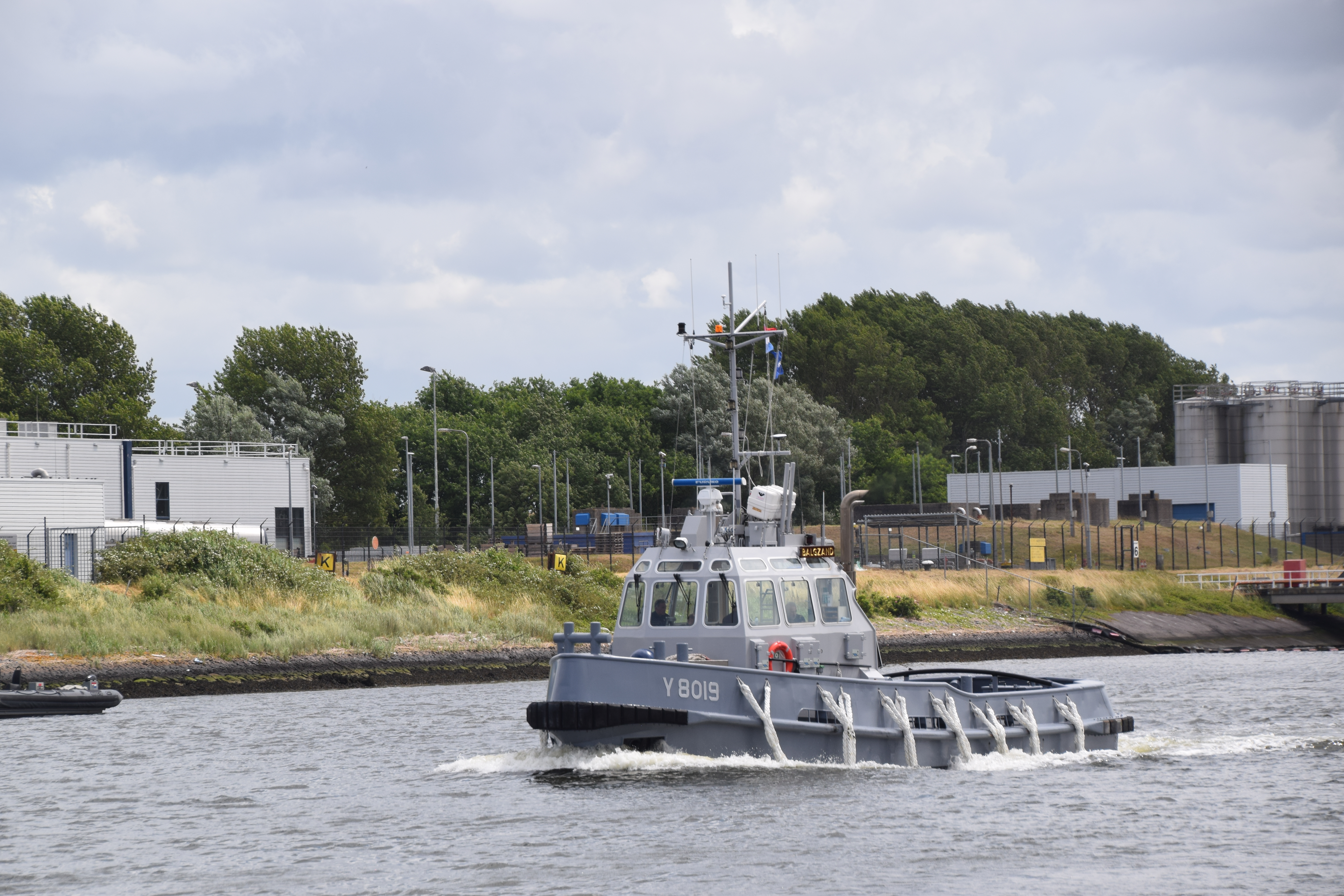
- Y8019 Balgzand

Class overview
- Name: Breezand class
- Builders: Delta Shipyard
- Operators: Royal Netherlands Navy
- Succeeded by: Cumulus class
- Built: 1988–1989
- In commission: 1989–present
- Planned: 2
- Completed: 2
- Active: 2

General characteristics
- Type: Harbour tugboat
- Tonnage: 74.50 GT
- Length: 16.53 m (54 ft 3 in)
- Beam: 5.32 m (17 ft 5 in)
- Draught: 1.80 m (5 ft 11 in)
- Propulsion: 2 × 760 hp (570 kW) Volvo Penta diesel engines
- Speed: 10 knots (19 km/h; 12 mph) (maximum)
- Crew: 3

The Breezand class (Note: The class is also known in Dutch as the Werf class.) are a class of tugboats used by the Royal Netherlands Navy, primarily to dock their smaller ships at the Nieuwe Haven Naval Base. In winter they are also used as icebreakers. They will be replaced by the Cumulus class.

== Ships in class ==
Breezand class construction data
Hull number	Name	Builder	Launched	Commissioned	Status	Notes
Y 8018	Breezand	Delta Shipyard, Sliedrecht	22 November 1989	1 December 1989	In active service	
Y 8019	Balgzand	Delta Shipyard, Sliedrecht	2 January 1990	12 January 1990	In active service	

=== Namesakes ===
The ships are named after locations near Den Helder:

- HNLMS Breezand's namesake is: The village of Breezand
- HNLMS Balgzand's namesake is: The nature reserve Balgzand

== Replacement ==
The Breezand class will be replaced, together with the Linge class, by a new class of medium-sized tugboats in 2027. The new tugs are based on the EuroTug 2007 design and will be built by Neptune Marine. After entering into service of the RNLN they will be moored at Fort Harssens in Den Helder.
