= Fortifications of Den Helder =

- Stelling Den Helder
- Den Helder in Netherlands
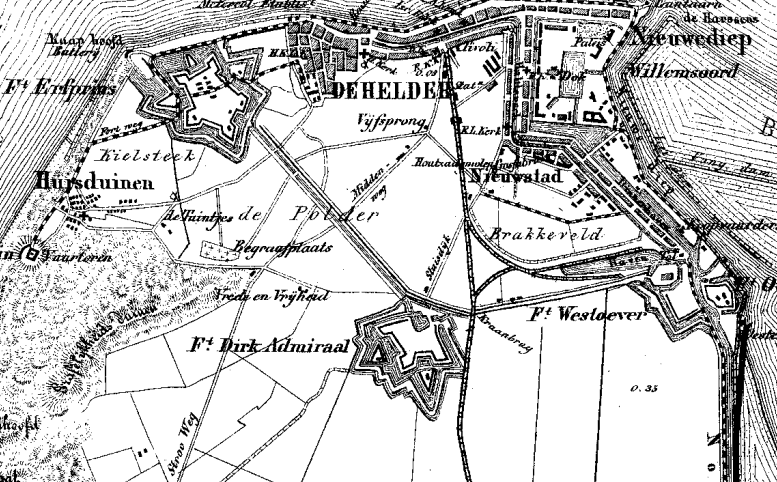
- The Den Helder Fortifications in 1869.

Location
- Coordinates: 52°57′30″N 4°45′29″E

Site history
- Built: 1600 - 1945
- Demolished: From 1951

The Fortifications of Den Helder form a circle of fortresses and other works that defended Den Helder in the Netherlands from the end of the 18th century till the end of World War II. They are now getting repurposed for tourism.

== Introduction ==
By the late 18th century, Den Helder or better the Nieuwediep was an important harbor. Starting in 1810, it was fortified, creating the Fortifications of Den Helder known in Dutch as Stelling Den Helder. During the nineteenth century the fortifications were improved and expanded. During World War II, the fortifications were garrisoned by the German army. Post war, the fortifications were decommissioned between 1951 and 1957. They are now getting re-developed for tourism.

== Early years ==
=== Lessons and plans ===
During the seventeenth and eighteenth centuries, the Zuiderzee became ever shallower while ships became bigger. At the end of the 18th century, this led to the development of the Nieuwediep, as a canal and deep harbor. The harbor was important for the republic's navy as well as its commercial ships. However, further development was barred by the cities on the Zuiderzee fearing that their commerce might move to Nieuwediep.

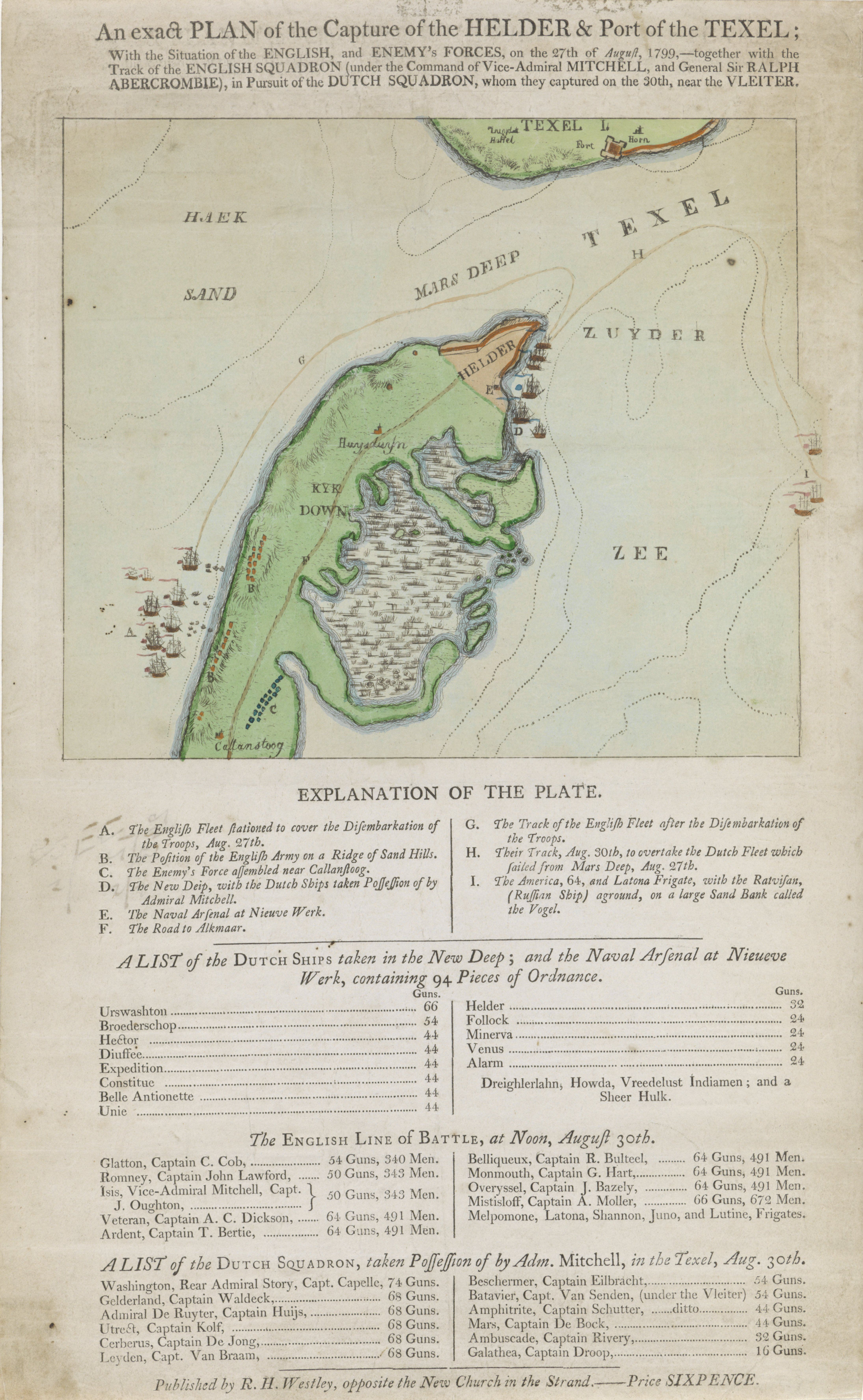
Anglo-Russian invasion

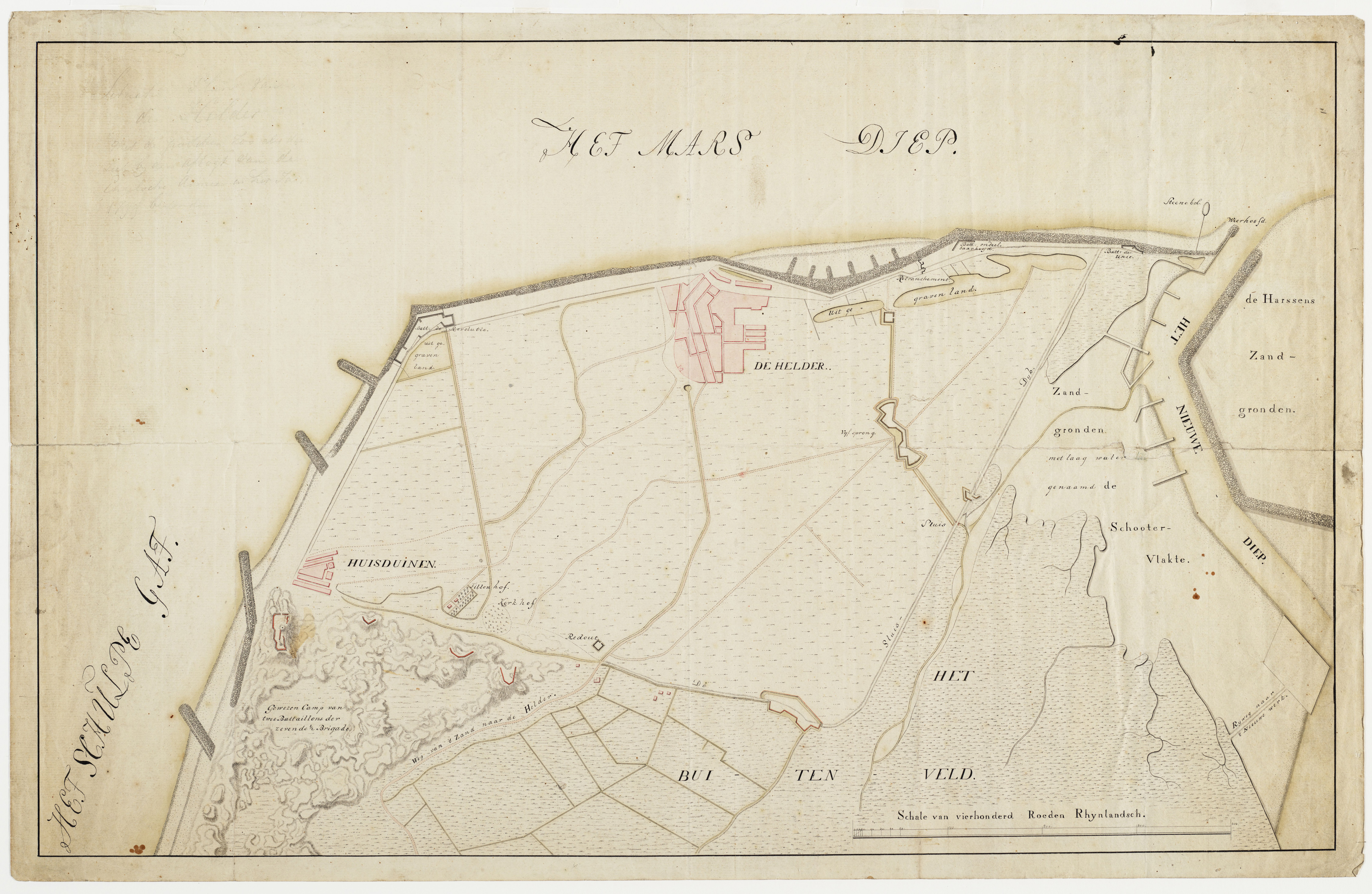
Den Helder in 1799

The 1799 Anglo-Russian invasion of Holland was a part of the War of the Second Coalition. It started with a landing near Callantsoog, just south of Den Helder on 27 August. This became the Battle of Callantsoog, which the Dutch lost.

After the defeat, Den Helder, or rather the harbor of Nieuwediep, was defended by two battalions. On its southern side Nieuwediep had an earth redoubt called 'Het Nieuwe Werk'. On the north side there was an old field fortification near the coast. There were 61 24-pdr guns and 22 lighter guns. However, these elements did not form a cohesive defensive position and so the two battalions were ordered to retreat. Without a possibility to use the coastal batteries to prevent the British fleet from appearing before Nieuwediep, the Dutch fleet retreated to the Vlieter. Cut off from its base, the Dutch fleet surrendered on 30 August 1799 in what became known as the Vlieter incident.

In 1807 king Louis Bonaparte visited the north of Holland and Texel and Nieuwediep. By then there were about a dozen warships in the harbor. Napoleon wanted to fortify the place, and transfer the Amsterdam navy base to Den Helder. The finances were the only problem. Indeed, King Louis regularly talked about the subject with Cornelis Krayenhoff, then director of fortifications in the department where Den Helder was located.

Kraijenhoff came with a plan to build: A fort at the Kijkduin dune, this would cover the Schulpengat, and allow mortars to cover the approaches to Nieuwediep; A brick fortress tower, tour-modèle behind the Kaaphoofd battery; another such tower at the southern end of Den Helder village; one more tower on the Sluisdijk; changing the Nieuwe Werk to a fortress; Building a fortress on top of the shoal De Laan. The estimated cost was about 2,000,000.

=== Construction of the fortifications ===
In October 1811 Napoleon visited Den Helder and Texel. He decided to create a base for building, repairing and equipping warships near Den Helder, which became Willemsoord, Den Helder. Den Helder and the base would be protected by a string of fortifications, costing 6 million Francs. Soon the construction of Fort Kijkduin and Fort Erfprins started, and Erfprins was connected to the Kaaphoofd battery. Somewhat later, the construction of Fort Dirksz Admiraal began, and het Nieuwe Werk was changed to a fortress.

During the revolt which led to the establishment of the Sovereign Principality of the United Netherlands, the naval base of Den Helder was held by the French side. By then, the Fortifications of Den Helder consisted of:

- Fort La Salle, later renamed Erfprins
- Fort Morland, later Kijkduin
- Fort L'Ecluse, later Dirksz Admiraal
- Fort Du Gonnier, later Oost-Oever
- The work on the Falga
- Battery La Révolution or l'Imperiale, later Kaap Hoofd
- Battery l'Indivisibilité, later Oost-Batterij

On 16 November 1813 commander Carel Hendrik Ver Huell declared Den Helder to be in a state of siege. Though not much was done in terms of besieging Den Helder, the siege lasted till 21 April 1814.

== The time of wooden ships (1815-1862) ==
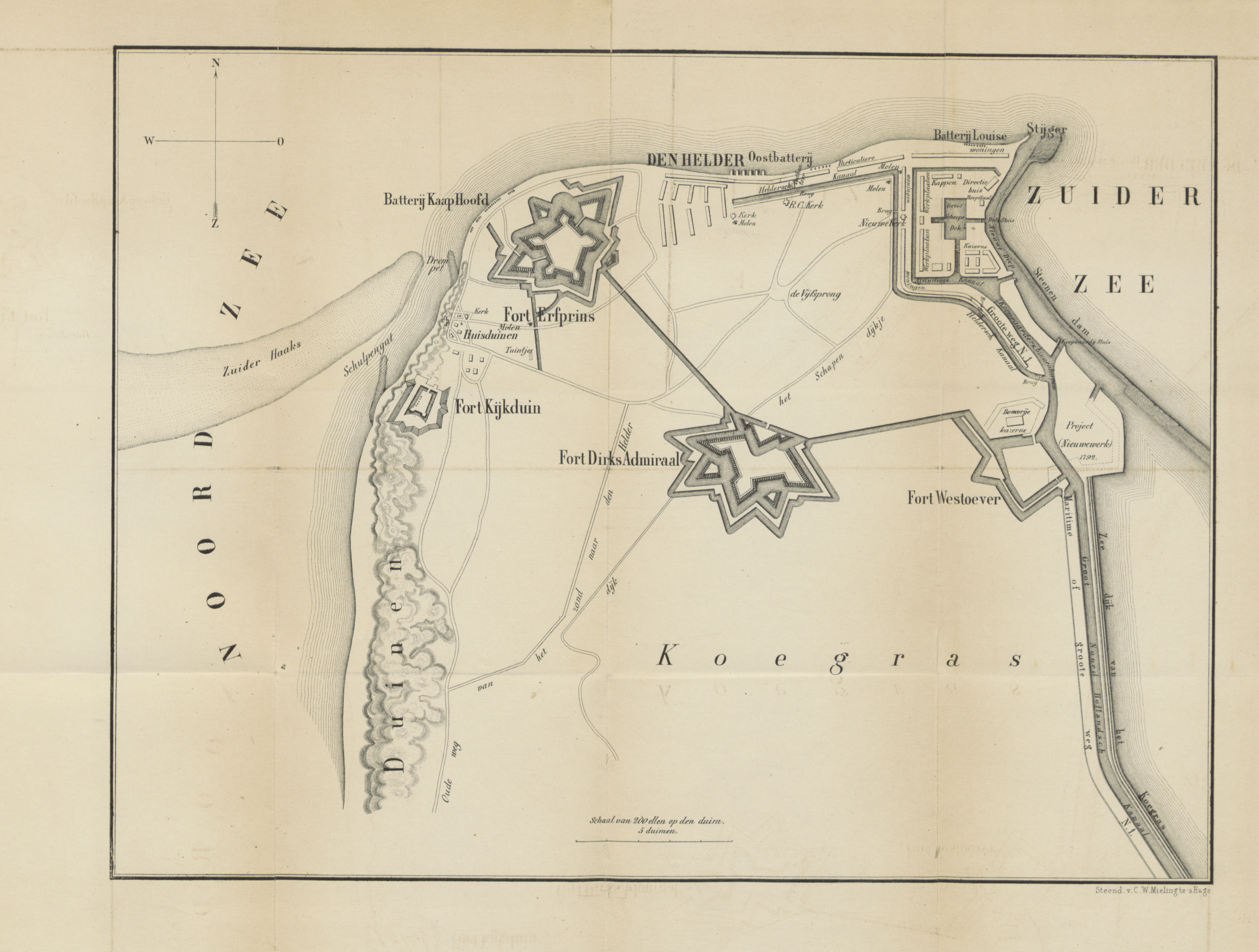
In 1847

In February 1818, a commission was appointed to investigate the defense of Den Helder and the Naval base Willemsoord. While these were busy years for the Willemsoord navy base, not much seems to have happened at the Fortifications of Den Helder during these years. Het Nieuwe Werk was changed to become Fort Oostoever. In 1825 Fort Westoever was built.

== Armor and modern artillery ==
=== Armored ships ===
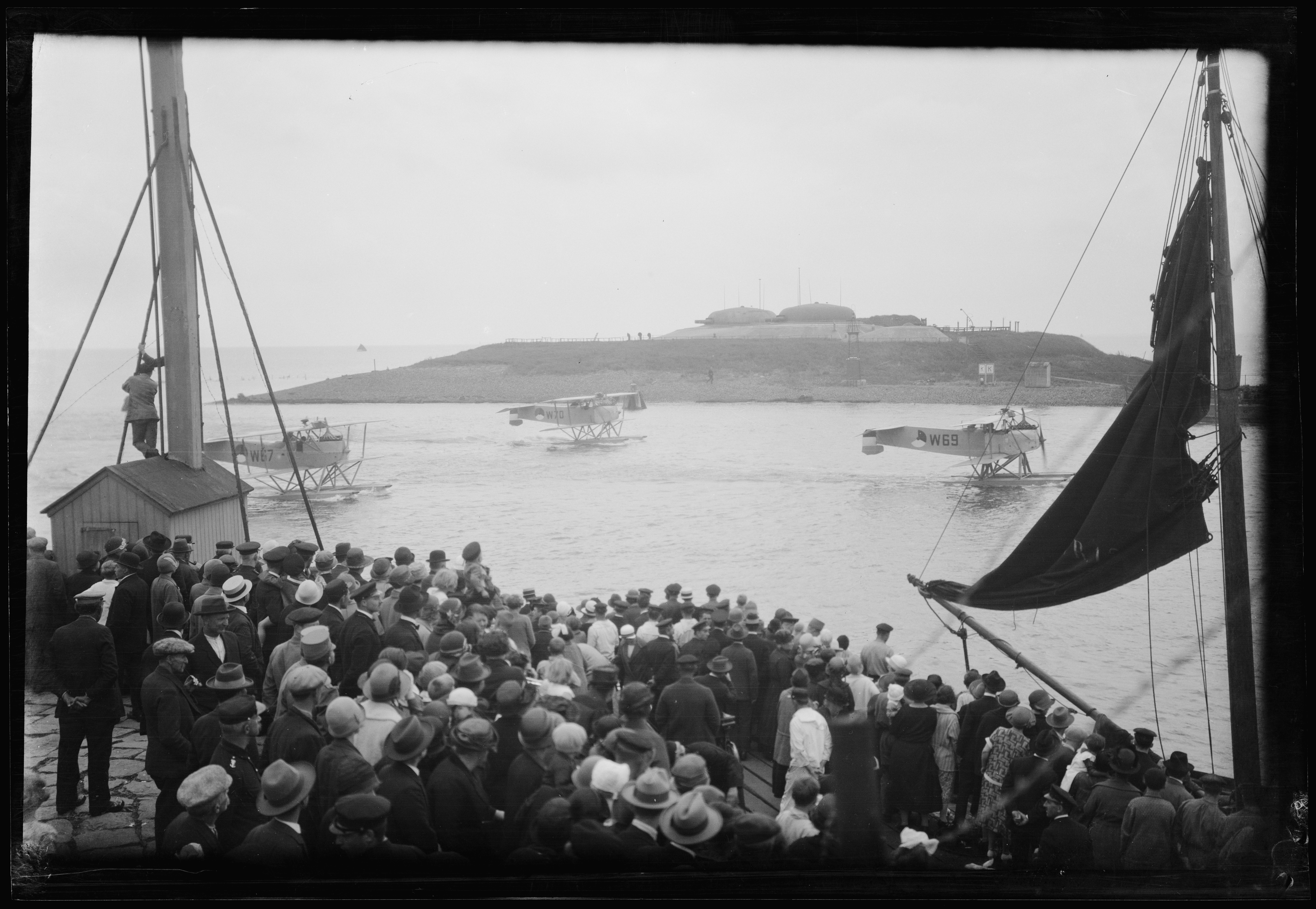
Harssens in 1925

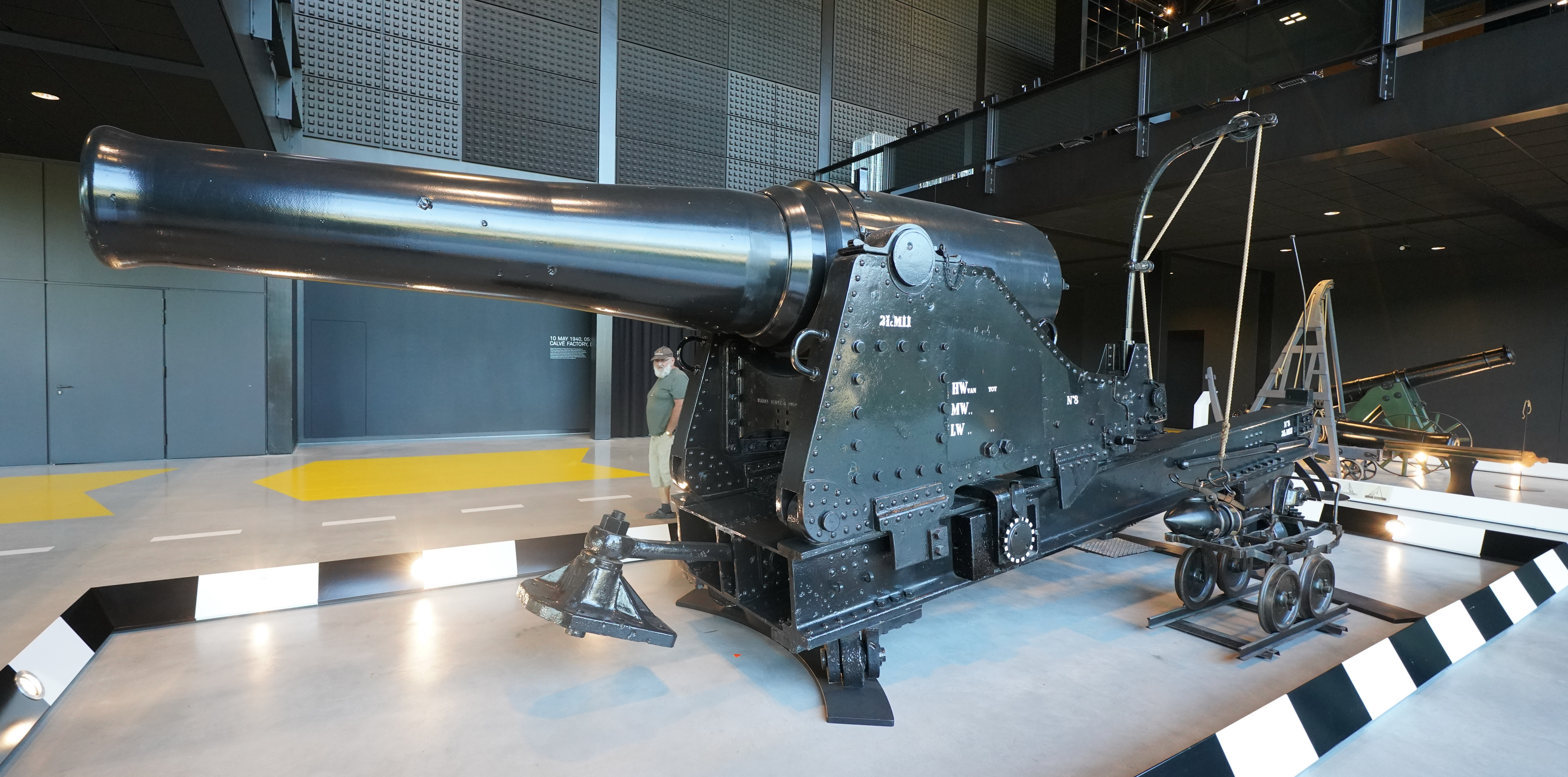
A 24 cm ijzer

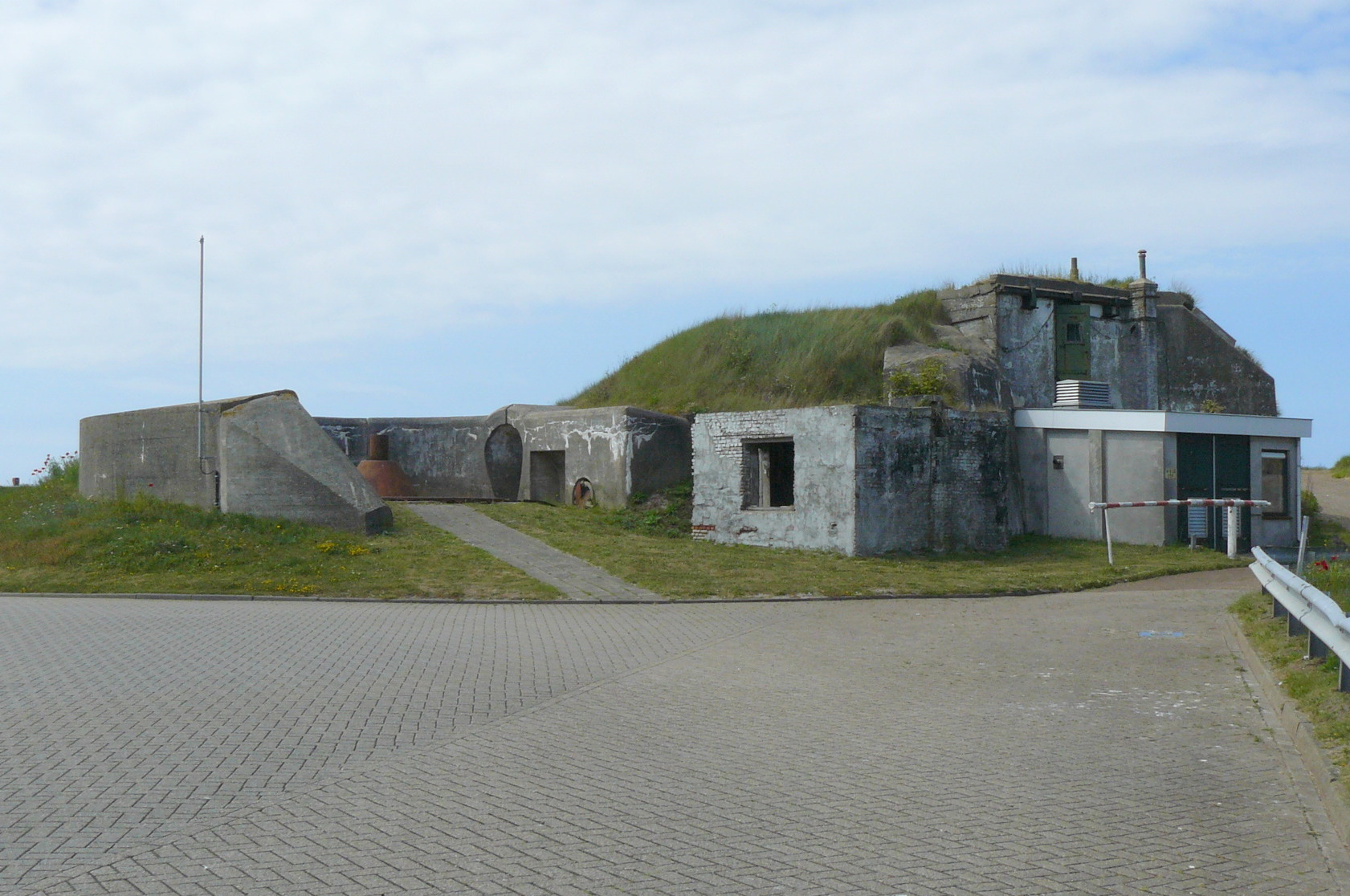
Emplacement for a 24 cm gun at Fort Erfprins

The 1862 Battle of Hampton Roads showed the power and near impregnability of armored ships. It sparked a wide interest in updating coastal defences. On 3 June 1864, a new commission for coastal defense was appointed. It opted for the principle that harbors and roadsteads would be defended by fixed fortifications. These would be supported by supported by shallow draught armored vessels like rams and monitors. The commission clearly advised to buy some of the new heavy guns that were in use or development abroad. These were to be placed on turntables.

For Den Helder, the commission proposed to build four brick towers at: One at the shoal De Laan, One at De Hors, one at Harssens (at the end of the east dam of Nieuwediep) and one at the Zuidwal (the shoal stretching from the east dam of the Nieuwediep towards the east). These were to be armed each with 8-12 heavy guns in armored iron cupolas. The commission also advised to re-arm some of the existing works with heavy caliber guns. Most of these should be able to penetrate armor at a distance of 2,000 m.

In 1870 the fortress law asked for money for a fort on the Zuidwal. A decision that was described as grabbing something from the plan. However, the decision was overturned when the next minister opted for the fortress on De Laan.

=== Modern artillery ===
The advancements in armor led to a speedy development of more powerful guns. This was the rifled breech loader constructed as a built-up gun. While the Dutch navy first standardized on the 9-inch Armstrong muzzle loader, the army looked to France and Germany. In 1870 the Dutch army got the 24 cm ijzer, an iron rifled breech loader based on a French model. Other guns that showed up in Den Helder were the 24 cm L/25 and the 24 cm K L/35.

=== 1886 Fort Harssens ===
In 1879 Minister of War Den Beer Poortugael took the lead and secured money to build Fort Harssens. That same year construction began. While there were some doubts about the plan it was deemed to be realistic and effective. With its two armored cupolas with two Krupp 30.5 cm MRK L/25 each, Fort Harssens was something very different from the existing 19th century forts.

Apart from building Fort Harssens there were also some other modernizations. Between 1875 and 1878 Fort Erfprins was modernized. It got an underground barracks for about 1,000 men, protected against grenade fire. Erfprins also got emplacements for 24 cm guns.

=== 1913 plans for Kijkduin ===
Just before World War I, the Dutch government decided to modernize Fort Kijkduin. It was planned to get armored cupolas with the 28 cm SK L/45 gun. This was a modern powerful gun. However, critics warned that doing the minimum of what was required, would lead to a quick obsolescence of the fortress. Due to World War I, the plan was not executed.

== The World Wars ==
During World War I the Fortifications of Den Helder were manned by the mobilized Dutch army. By then, the fortresses and their heavy artillery might still have seemed impressive. In reality most of it was already obsolete in 1906. By then, guns like 24 cm ijzer and the 24 cm L/25 were completely useless against modern battleships. The only guns that were still dangerous to enemy capital ships were those of Fort Harssens.

During the Interwar period the Dutch government severely economized on defense spending. Some new light caliber guns were put into service in the area, but with regard to big guns, nothing was done. In about 1930, the big guns of Fort Harssens were decommissioned. Just before World War II the fortifications and their guns no longer posed a serious threat to enemy warships.

During World War II, the German army garrisoned the Fortifications of Den Helder. For Germany the base was important for the small craft of its navy and to protect coastal shipping. The Germans built a number of bunkers and anti-aircraft emplacements to protect their position.

== Disarmament and tourism ==
Post World War II, fortifications like those of Den Helder were completely obsolete. It meant that they were disarmed, but that did not mean that the buildings were immediately abandoned. While the army retreated from the fortresses, the Dutch navy expanded and could use some buildings. In 1950 the army transferred Fort Erfprins to the navy to use as a training facility. It also transferred other facilities. For some time it held on to Fort Dirks Admiraal.

In 1989 the foundation "Stichting Stelling Den Helder" was founded. It aimed to preserve the fortifications of Den Helder. The first activities were guided tours at Fort Kijkduin, which also aimed to raise public awareness of the fortress. The end of the Cold War would lead to less work for the Dutch military, which the municipality tried to compensate by developing tourism. In 1992 the foundation became the owner of the fortress and in 1993 it got a subsidy of 7.2 million guilders to restore the fort. Fort Westoever would be next.

== Elements of Stelling Den Helder ==
These are some parts of the Fortifications of Den Helder that are still more or less intact.

- Fort Kijkduin
- Fort Erfprins
- Fort Dirks Admiraal
- Fort Harssens
- Fort Westoever
- Fort Oostoever
- Batterij Kaaphoofd
- Oostbatterij
