= Noordzee-class tugboat =

Ship design project of the Royal Netherlands Navy

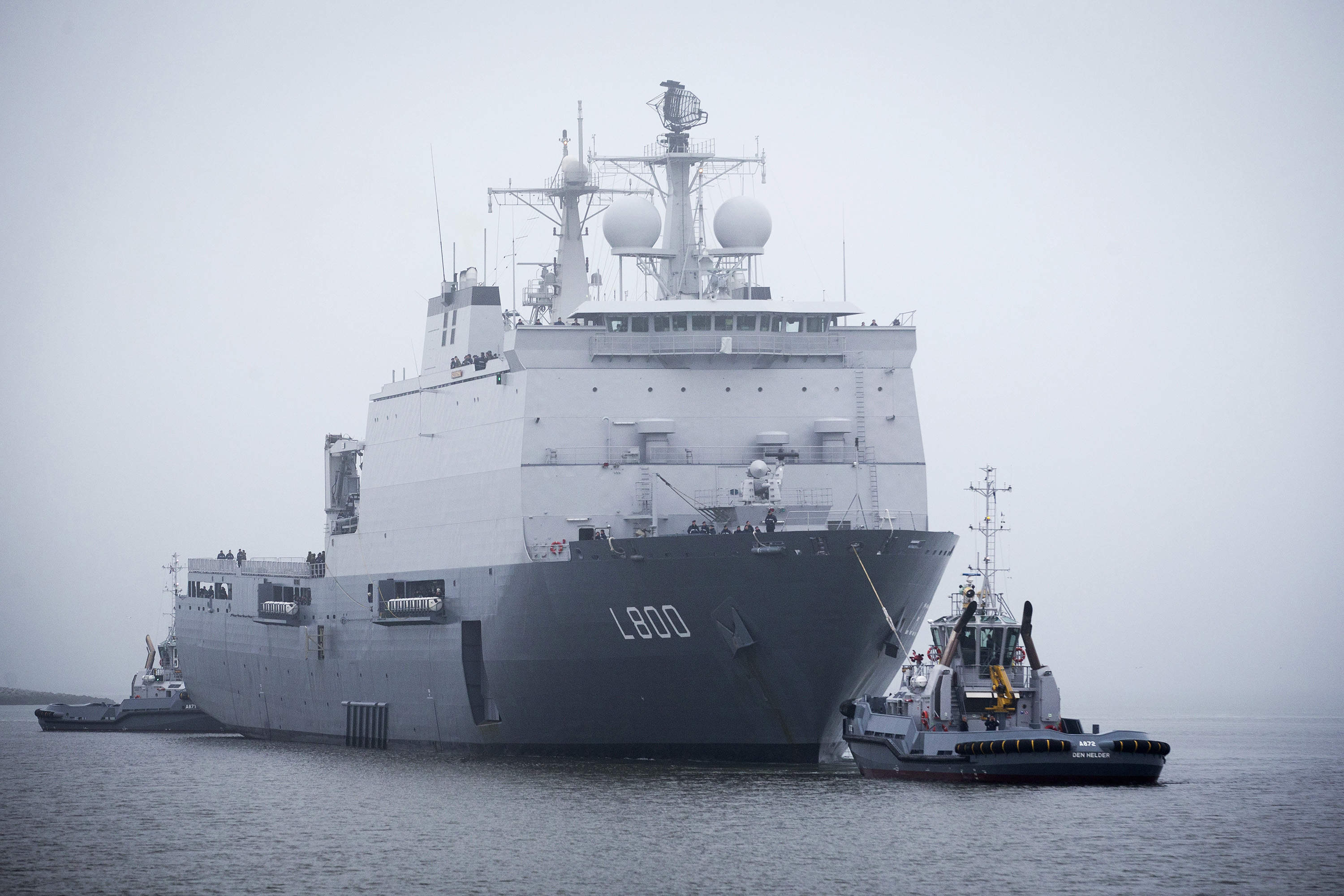
- Noordzee and Waddenzee towing HNLMS Rotterdam (centre) in 2016

Class overview
- Name: Noordzee class
- Builders: Damen Group
- Operators: Royal Netherlands Navy
- Preceded by: Linge class
- Built: 1986–1997
- In commission: 1987–present
- Planned: 3
- Completed: 3
- Active: 3

General characteristics
- Type: Coastal tugboat
- Displacement: 575 tons
- Length: 28.67 m (94 ft 1 in)
- Beam: 10.43 m (34 ft 3 in)
- Draught: 4.9 m (16 ft 1 in)
- Propulsion: Diesel-electric engines
- Speed: 13.4 knots (24.8 km/h; 15.4 mph) (maximum)
- Complement: 5

The Noordzee class are a class of tugboats used by the Royal Netherlands Navy to dock their larger ships at the Nieuwe Haven Naval Base.

== History ==
In January 2014 it was announced that the older Linge-class tugboats were not capable enough anymore to handle the newer larger vessels like HNLMS Karel Doorman and the four oldest ships would be replaced by three Damen build hybrid tugboats. These would become the Noordzee class.

With the arrival of the first new tugboat, HNLMS Noordzee, the older tugboats did not prove completely useless when the power onboard Noordzee shut off due to contaminated fuel along the coast of North-Holland and HNLMS Hunze had to assist. As an avocation to their main purpose they are used for trips with guests around the harbour.

== Boats ==
Noordzee class construction data
Hull number	Name	Builder	Launched	Commissioned	Status	Picture	Notes
A871	Noordzee	Damen Group, Galati		11 July 2016	In active service		
A872	Waddenzee	Damen Group, Galati		11 July 2016	In active service		
A873	Zuiderzee	Damen Group, Galati		11 July 2016	In active service		

=== Namesakes ===
All the ships are named after seas with current or former Dutch shores:

- HNLMS Noordzee's namesake is the North Sea.
- HNLMS Waddenzee's namesake is the Wadden Sea.
- HNLMS Zuiderzee's namesake is the Zuiderzee.

== Citations ==
=== Bibliography ===
- Burger, Willem (May 2016). "Sleepboten voor Nederland en Zweden" (PDF). Marineblad (in Dutch). Vol. 126, no. 3. pp. 28–31.
