= Westgat-class tugboat =

Class of tugboat

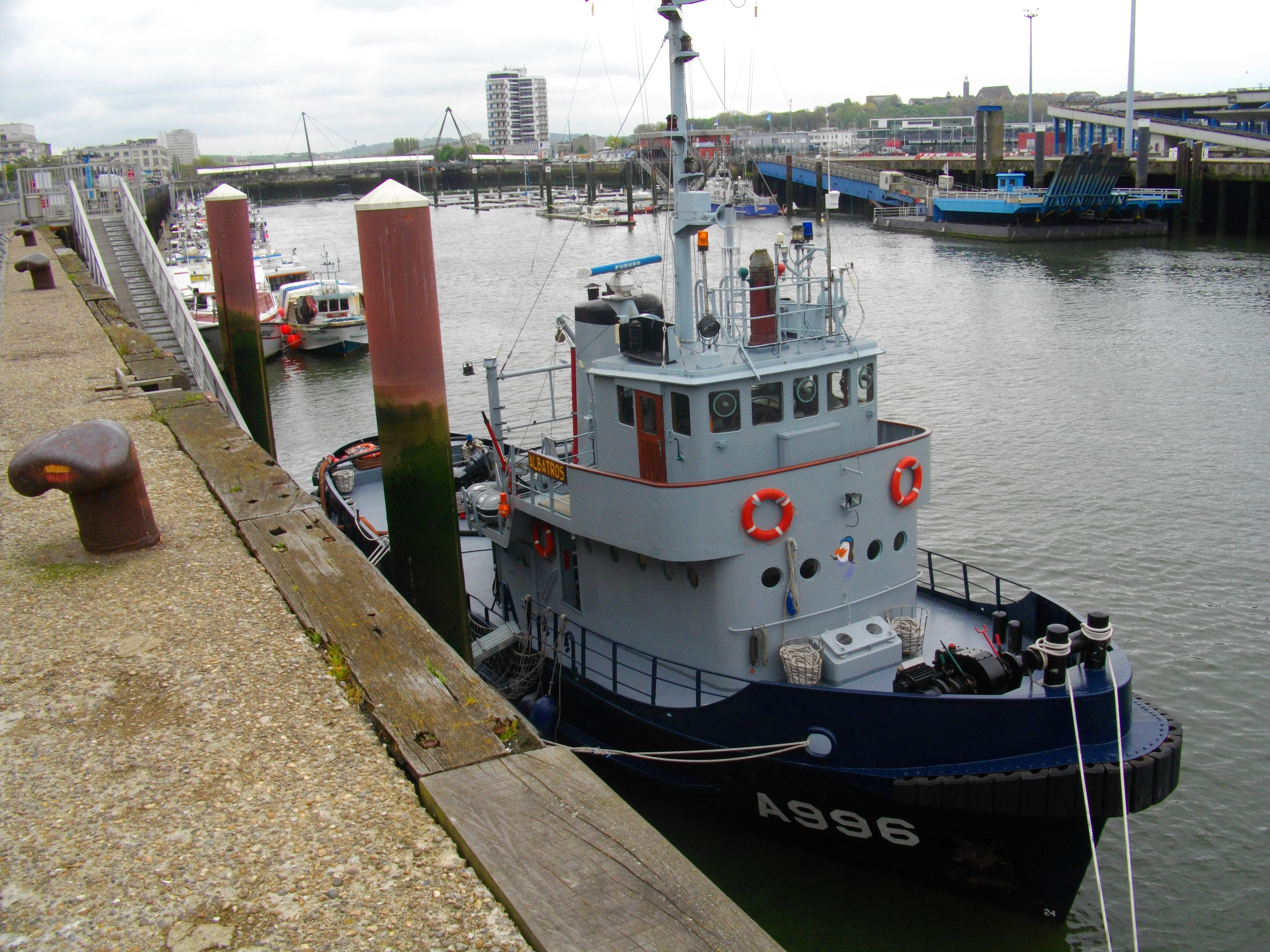
- Former HNLMS Westgat as Albatros

Class overview
- Name: Westgat class
- Builders: Rijkswerf Willemsoord, Den Helder
- Operators: Royal Netherlands Navy; Belgian Navy
- Succeeded by: Linge class
- Built: 1967–1968
- Completed: 2

General characteristics
- Type: Tugboat
- Displacement: 206 t (203 long tons)
- Length: 27.2 m (89 ft 3 in)
- Beam: 7 m (23 ft 0 in)
- Draft: 2.3 m (7 ft 7 in)
- Propulsion: 1 propeller; 720 hp (540 kW); Bolnes diesel engine
- Speed: 12 knots (22 km/h; 14 mph)
- Crew: 9

The Westgat class (Note: The class was also known in Dutch as Wielingen type.) was a ship class of two tugboats that were built in the Netherlands for the Royal Netherlands Navy. One of the vessels was later sold to the Belgian Navy.

== Design and construction ==
The tugboats of the Westgat class were constructed at the Rijkswerf in Willemsoord. Both tugboats were commissioned into the Royal Netherlands Navy in 1968.

While the tugboats of the Westgat class were unarmed, they could be equipped with two 20 mm guns. In addition, both tugboats were equipped with firefighting and salvage installations.

== Ships in class ==
Westgat class construction data
Pennant no.	Name	Builder	Laid down	Launched	Commissioned	Decommissioned	Fate
A 872	Westgat	Rijkswerf Willemsoord, Den Helder, Netherlands	3 April 1967	22 August 1967	10 January 1968	1997	Transferred to the Belgian Navy and renamed Albatros (A996)
A 873	Wielingen	Rijkswerf Willemsoord, Den Helder, Netherlands	22 August 1967	6 January 1968	31 May 1968		Sold in 1992 and renamed Pieter
