= Fort Harssens =

Fortress in Den Helder, Netherlands

- Den Helder in Netherlands
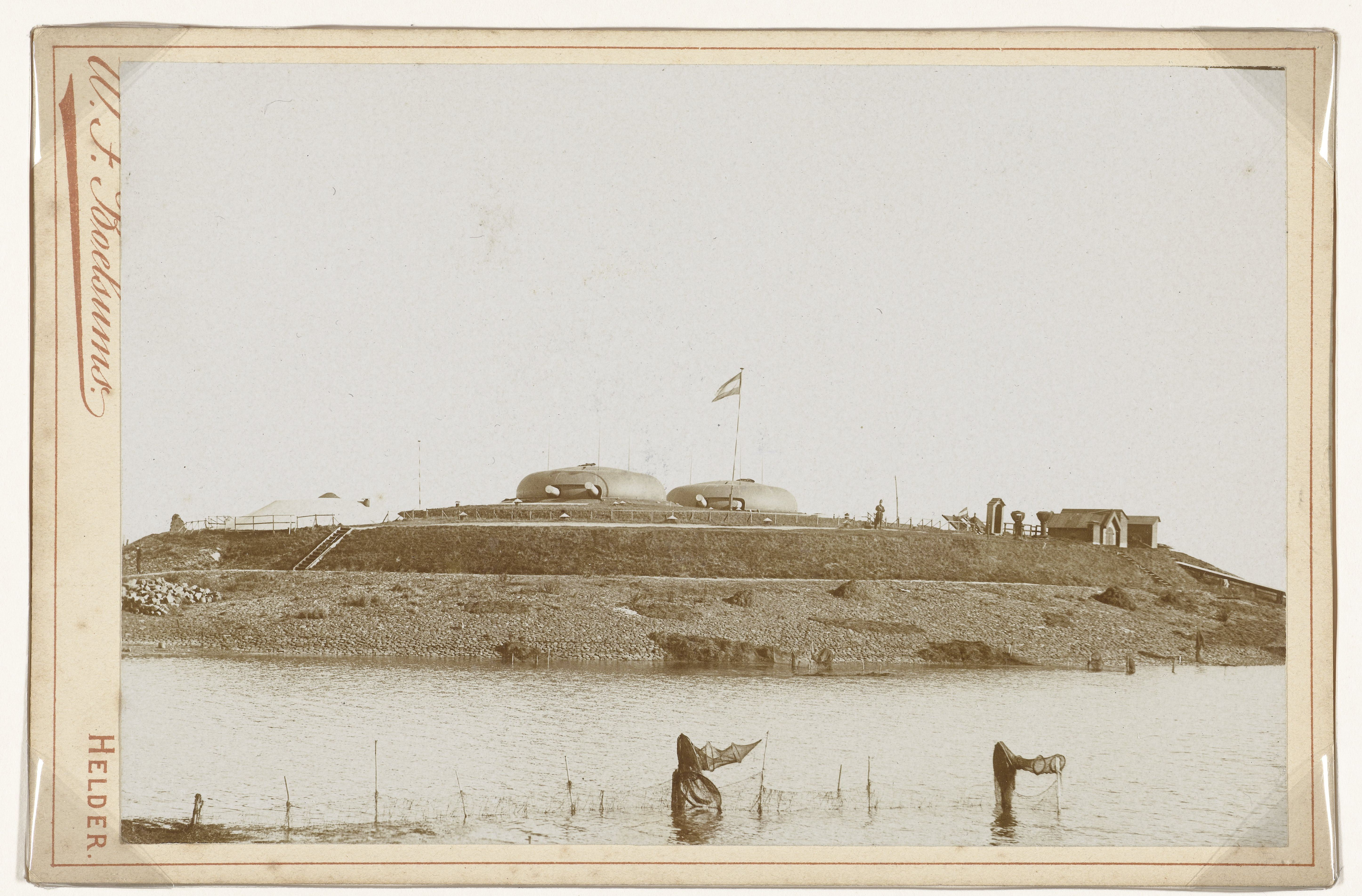
- The fortress somewhere between 1895 and 1915

Location
- Coordinates: 52°57′50″N 4°46′54″E

Site history
- Built: 1884

Fort Harssens is a former fortress and museum in Den Helder North-Holland. It protected the naval base Willemsoord. The fortress had 4 heavy naval guns placed in two armored cupolas. Nowadays, the maritime traffic control center sits on top of the fortress.

== Planning and construction ==
=== Den Helder as a Naval Base ===
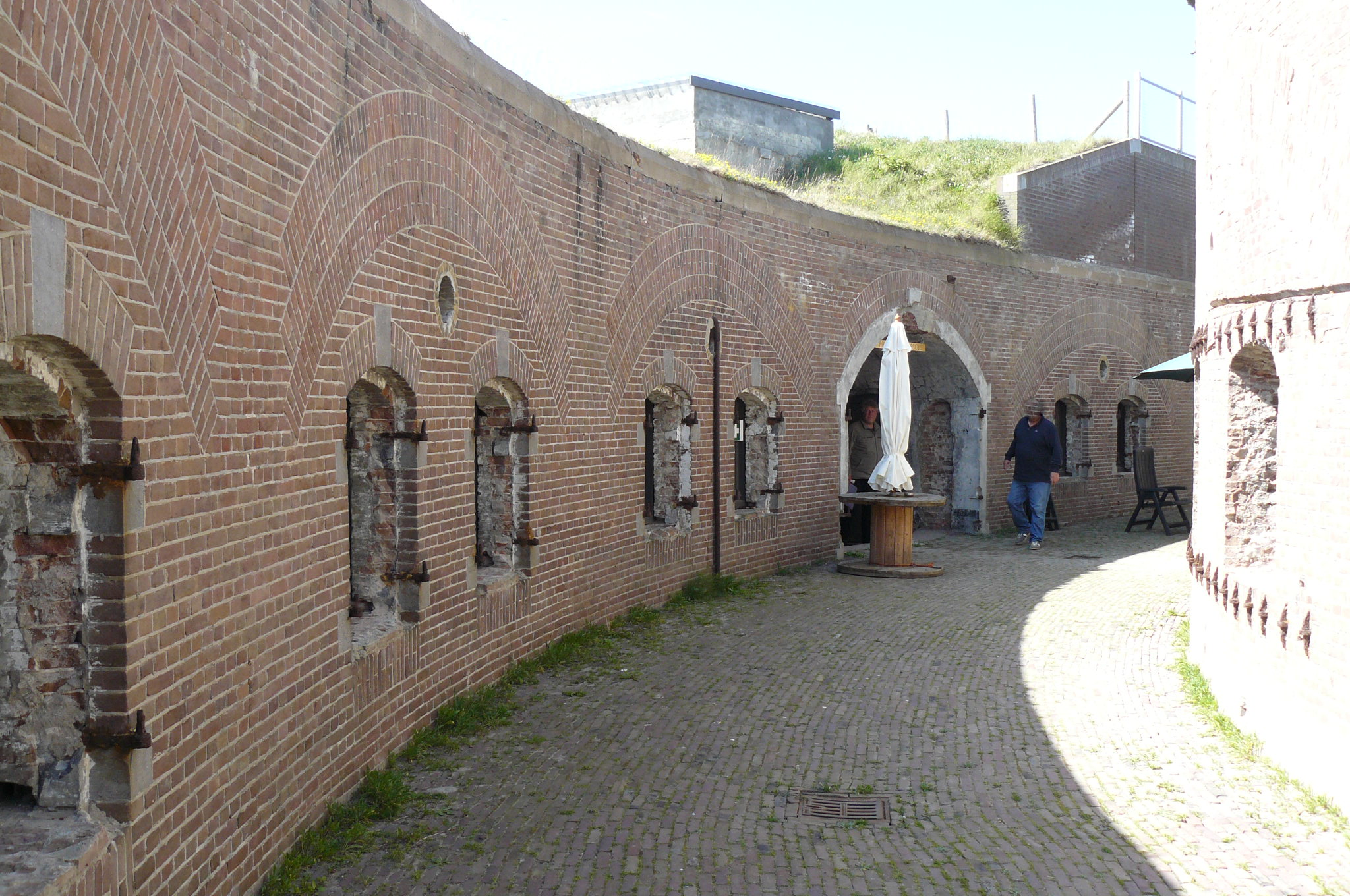
The dry moat and current approach

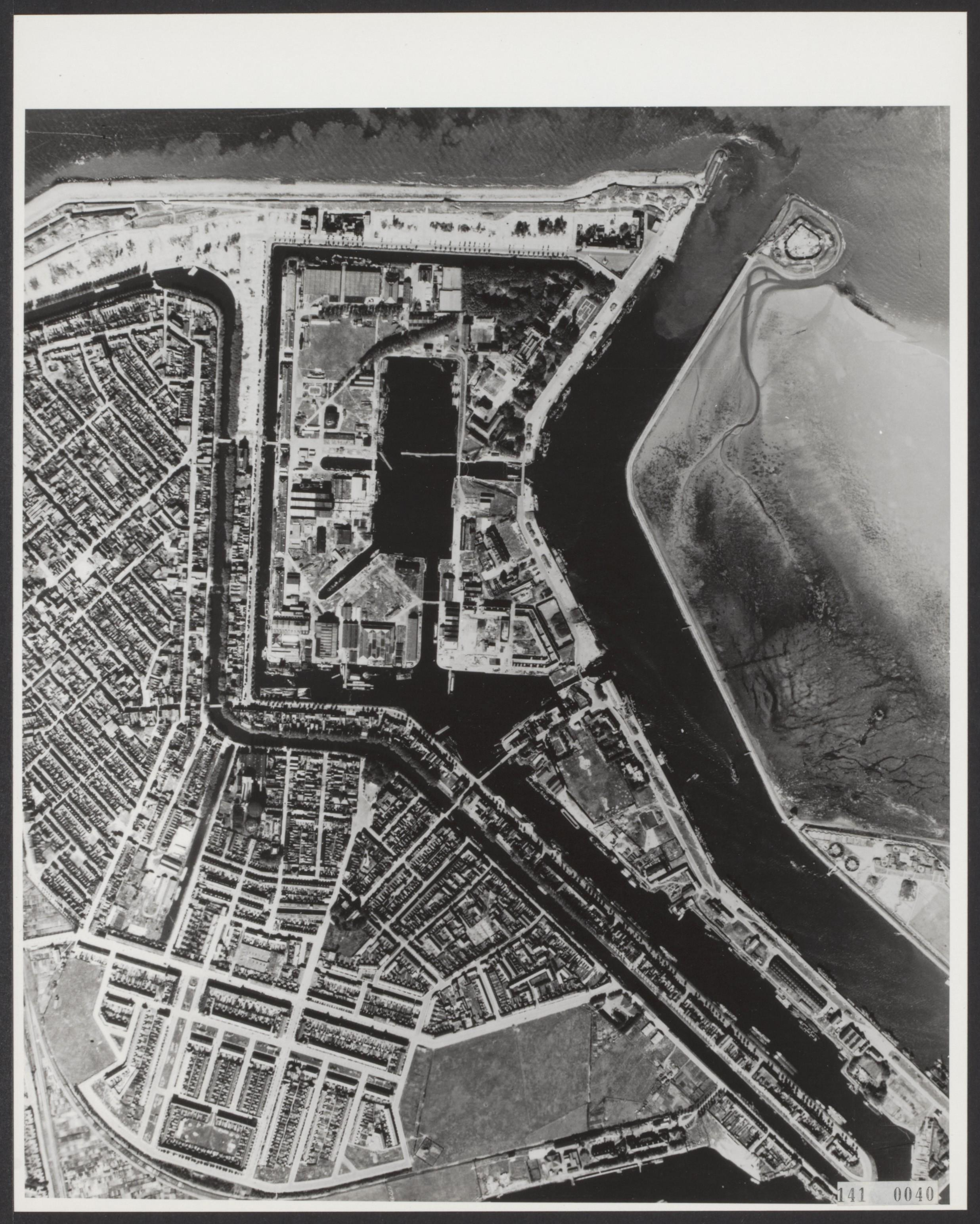
On the top right (ca. 1945)

In the late eighteenth century, a harbor was constructed at the Nieuwediep (river). This later became the naval base Willemsoord. Due to the construction of the Noordhollandsch Kanaal, Den Helder also became the access to the port of Amsterdam. Soon, plans were developed to cover Den Helder with fortifications. In 1803 Jan Blanken made a plan to build a fort in the water just outside the base. Another plan called for a fort in the Marsdiep of about 80 guns and 500 men. These first plans were not executed.

In 1811 Napoleon visited Den Helder and saw the potential of the site. He ordered the construction of the first fortresses and a big naval base. This led to the Fortifications of Den Helder and the naval base Willemsoord. The daring plans for a fortress in the water were not executed.

=== A plan for Fort Harssens ===
In 1875 the minister of war Enderlein came with a specific plan to build a fortress on the shoal Harssens, on the east bank of the Nieuwediep. By 1875 a plan had been made for a fortification at Harssens. An investigation of the grounds was already underway. Enderlein wanted to postpone all other plans till this was ready.

There were many other plans. Weitzel and others wanted a fort in sea at the shoal 'De Laan'. Van Stirum and others a fortress on the shoal 'Zuidwal' to the northeast of Harssens. Others did not want to do anything until there was an overall plan for the defense of Den Helder.

In 1879 Minister of War Den Beer Poortugael took action by amending the fortifications budget law for 1879. 300,000 guilders were allotted for Fort Harssens. The total cost of the fortress was estimated at 1,050,000. There were some doubts about the plan, but many also understood that in view of the higher cost of alternatives, Fort Harssens was a realistic and effective option. In 1880 another 200,000 guilders were allotted to the fortress.

=== Construction ===
On 16 August 1879, the construction of the flood resistant glacis of the fortress was awarded to contractor J.J. Bakker from Lent for 143,900 guilders. In 1879 a commission of officers visited Germany and its coastal fortresses of Langlütjen. It noted that with the new high caliber guns, buildings in front of the guns would not be inhabitable. This led to a design change. In 1880, the total cost of the fortress was estimated at 1,344,000 guilders.

In mid-1880 the Minister of War Reuther asked for 261,000 guilders extra to place two orders. The first was to buy the first two 30.5 cm MRK L/25 guns, a test carriage and 100 shells for 221,000 guilders at Krupp. The second was to order a minimum port-carriage (Minimalscharten Lafette) for 40,000 guilders at Gruson in Magdeburg. The first gun was necessary for a test at Krupp's. The second gun was needed to test the minimum port-carriage. These two orders would allow the armored cupolas to be put in place in the Summer of 1883.

In December 1880 the construction of the actual (brick) fortress was tendered. The tender was wun by P. Duinker from Nieuwediep for 329,447 guilders. By November 1881, the total expected cost of the fortress had increased to 1,455,160 guilders.

In Spring 1883 the first parts of the armored cupolas arrived in Nieuwediep. The 55t heavy armor plates of the cupola would also arrive by rail. The special company lighter H. Gruson was sent to Nieuwediep in order to transport the plates over the Nieuwediep. The lighter carried a wagon on which the plates would be transloaded, on the other side, the vessel align its rail with that on the shore, by using a hydraulic system. A steam engine would then tow the loaded wagon up to the fortress.

In February 1885 a test of the artillery took place. After firing a few shots, some damage led to the suspension of the tests. On resumption of the tests, an elevation cylinder filled with glycerol broke and put the second carriage out of action. In Den Helder some windows broke due to the pressure waves. When the final and official tests took place in September 1885, the guns were fully loaded. During this test, hundreds of windows were broken, and local politicians asked for compensation.

== Characteristics ==
=== The concept ===
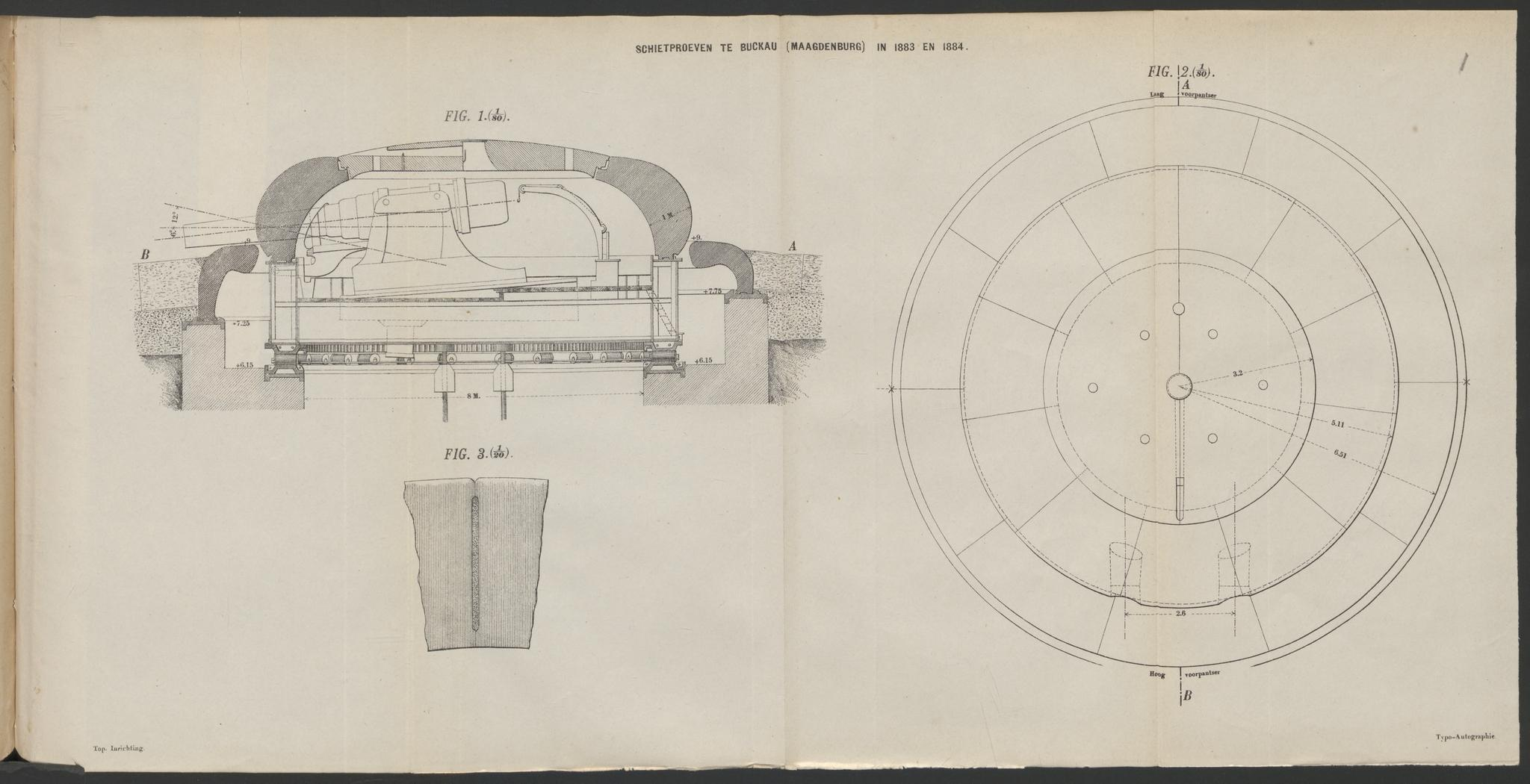
One of the armored cupolas.

The plans for Fort Harssens were based on the idea that by itself, the fortress would have to be able to fight a strong enemy fleet and resist it. Therefore, the fortress had to be well armored and armed with guns of high caliber. Already in 1879, it was known that the Minister of War wanted the fortress to get two armored cupolas with two 30.5 cm MRK L/25 guns each. That year, the minister explained that at a distance of up to 2,400 m, the 30.5 cm Krupp guns were able to penetrate the armor of the heaviest battleship that could approach Den Helder. This would allow the fortress to prevent these ships from getting so close that they could seriously hurt the fortress.

Some members of parliament wanted to economize by using lighter guns and compensating for this by using heavier armor. The minister explained that the 30.5 cm MRK L/25 gun could penetrate a 40 cm thick armor plate at 2,900 m while a 28 cm gun could only do this up to a distance of 1,700 m. Using the lighter 28 cm would allow enemy ships to approach the fortress more closely, allowing them to destroy the fortress by repeated hits at the same spots of the armored cupolas. Some members of parliament doubted this, because the minister did think lighter guns good enough for the fortress at IJmuiden. The minister then explained that Den Helder had a wide stretch of deep water in front of it, allowing enemy ships to maneuver in front of it. At IJmuiden, enemy ships could only close in by steaming up the outer parts of the canal, making them an easy target.

=== The value of the armored cupolas ===
The Dutch government had made some tests of the cupola's armor against its new Krupp 25 cm L/25 gun part of its contract with Gruson. The tests got a lot of international attention. They were attended by the whole German artillery test commission, Henri Alexis Brialmont, the Japanese and Chinese ambassadors etc.

Each of the three kinds op plates that were used in the fort had to be able to withstand four shots hitting close to each other. One of these tests took place on 22 October 1883. The target was a mock-up cupola of several armor plates. The first target was a 'front plate' that was to be in a fixed position before the lower section of the turning cupola. It had a maximum thickness of 1,060 mm. The gun, mounted on its minimum port carriage, stood 27 m from the mock-up cupola. With the fourth hit from the gun, the armor plate broke and parts of it fell inside, thus failing the test. The second target was a plate that formed part of the side armor of the cupola itself. The results were similar to the previous test. The third test took place in May 1884 against a top plate of the cupola and was quite successful.

While the cupola failed the test, the interpretation of the results was not that easy. For some experts, the test definitely showed that the Gruson's chilled iron (Hartguss) armored cupolas were no longer relevant after Krupp replaced its Hartguss shot with its steel grenades (Stahlgranate), and that earth work fortifications were better. Others noted that the first three shot had not penetrated the armor.

As principle of these tests, the Dutch Ministry of War had the most information. A commission that attended the tests concluded that the front plates were not good enough and also required a different position and more support, so no loosened parts could fall out of position. Positive notes were that the shot had not penetrated the armor, and that the Gruson chilled iron was of a uniform quality. The net result of the test was that the front plates were not accepted, and Gruson was told to improve these. For the cupola plates, some minor changes were made, primarily with regard to how they were fitted to the wrought iron underside of the cupola. The commission also noted that for calculating the resistance of armor, the nature of each individual shot and the vis viva that was actually brought to bear due to the angle at which the shot hit, were essential.

== Usage ==
=== First years ===
In 1886, the Dutch Ministry of War formed a new organization to man the three armored fortresses that were under construction: Harssens, IJmuiden, and Hoek van Holland. Each of these would get a separate Pantserfort Compagnie. On 1 May 1886, the Harssens Company was founded. On 1 September 1922, the Pantserfort companies became part of a coastal artillery regiment.

In January 1887, new exercises did not lead to any damage. This was thought to be due to the direction of the wind. On the contrary, at Terschelling the loud shots led to steamboats seeking for a ship in distress. In August 1887, there were new exercises. This time, some Rijkswaterstaat buildings at Koopvaarders Lock lost a few windows.

=== Later years ===
Exercises with big guns always posed a serious danger for shipping. Therefore, there was always an official advance warning. One of the last warnings of firing guns from the fortress dates from 1926. However, there were still some very minor investments in improving the effectiveness of the fortress in 1929.

Somewhere in these years, the big guns were relinquished from service. In the evening of 31 August 1933, fireworks were ignited on the dam east of the Nieuwediep. Inadvertently, three fires were started in the grasses on the dam and on the fortress. This made for a spectacular sight. A tugboat and naval personnel intervened and put out the fire after about half an hour. Fears that there was still ammunition in the fortress proved unfounded.

== World War II ==
In May 1940, invading German forces took control of the fortress. By then, the guns and cupolas were obsolete. They were dismantled in order to re-use the metal.

== Post World War II ==
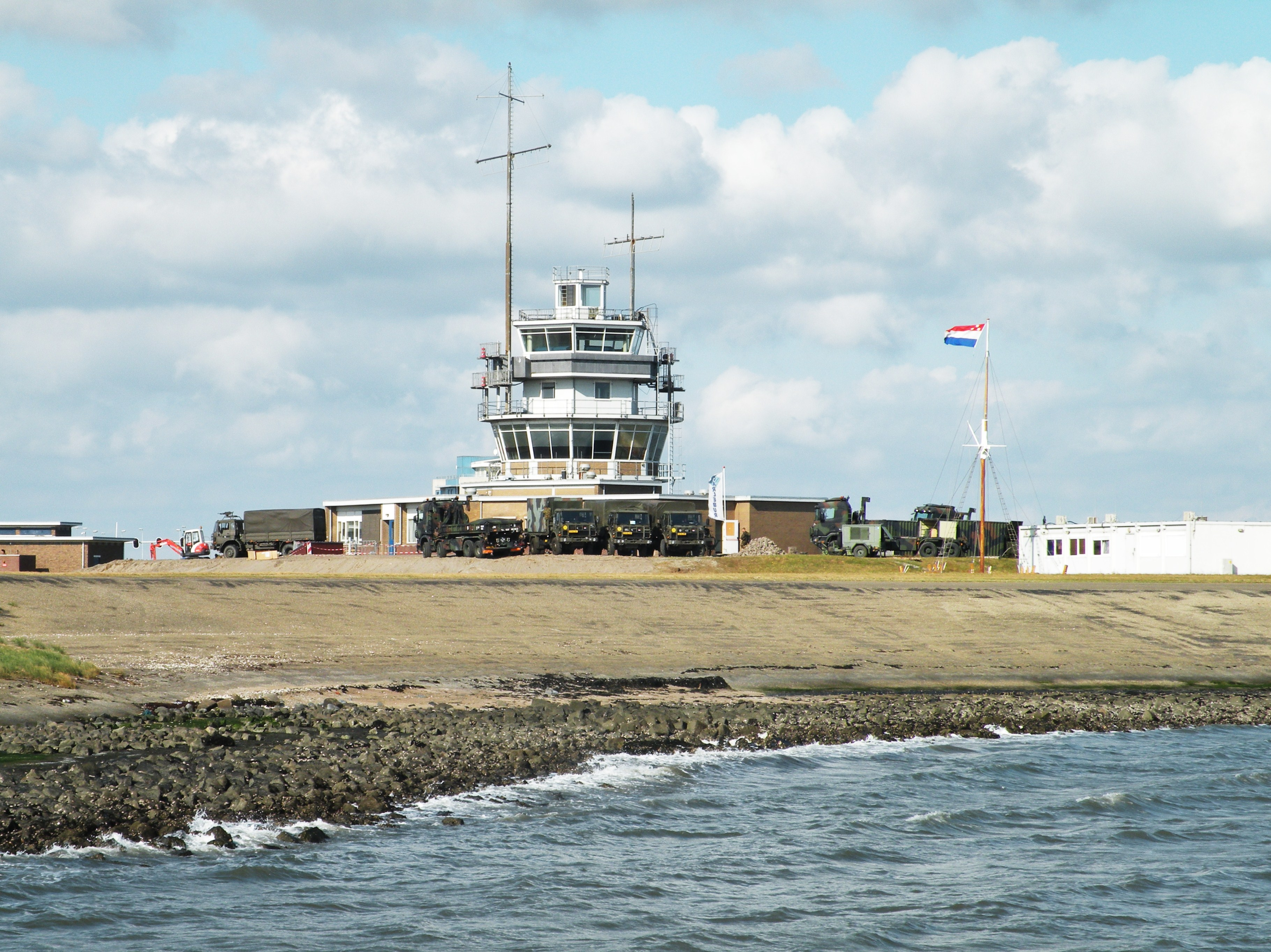
The now replaced harbor tower in 2009

The old naval base Willemsoord had been designed for 19th century ships of the line. Already before World War II, Dutch ships like the flagship De Ruyter were too long for the old harbor. Therefore, a plan was made to construct a new base at Den Helder. This plan created the Nieuwe Haven. This was planned on the east bank of the Nieuwediep and would be made by raising the level of the grounds east of the Nieuwediep. About 200 m south of Harssens, a 170 m long stretch of the east dam of the Nieuwediep would be removed to create an entry from the Nieuwe Haven to the Nieuwediep and the old base. Fort Harssens would get a connection to the mainland by a bridge over the Nieuwediep.

In 1952, there were plans to build an office for the Nieuwe Haven on of the old fortress. This was done, and so the fortress disappeared from view because the dry moats were filled up and the office hid the top of the fortress.

In relation with the plans for a new office and maritime control center, one of the dry moats was excavated in 2009. This was to see what was left of it. In 2016, a serious renovation was started. The fortress is now open to the public for guided tours, but is still military terrain.

On 12 July 2011 the new Haven Coördinatie Centrum Den Helder was officially opened by Mrs. Elisabeth Post, deputy of the King's commissioner in Noord-Holland. The so-called Vessel Traffic Control Center controls military and civilian maritime traffic to and from Den Helder.
