= Nieuwediep (river) =

Canal and harbour

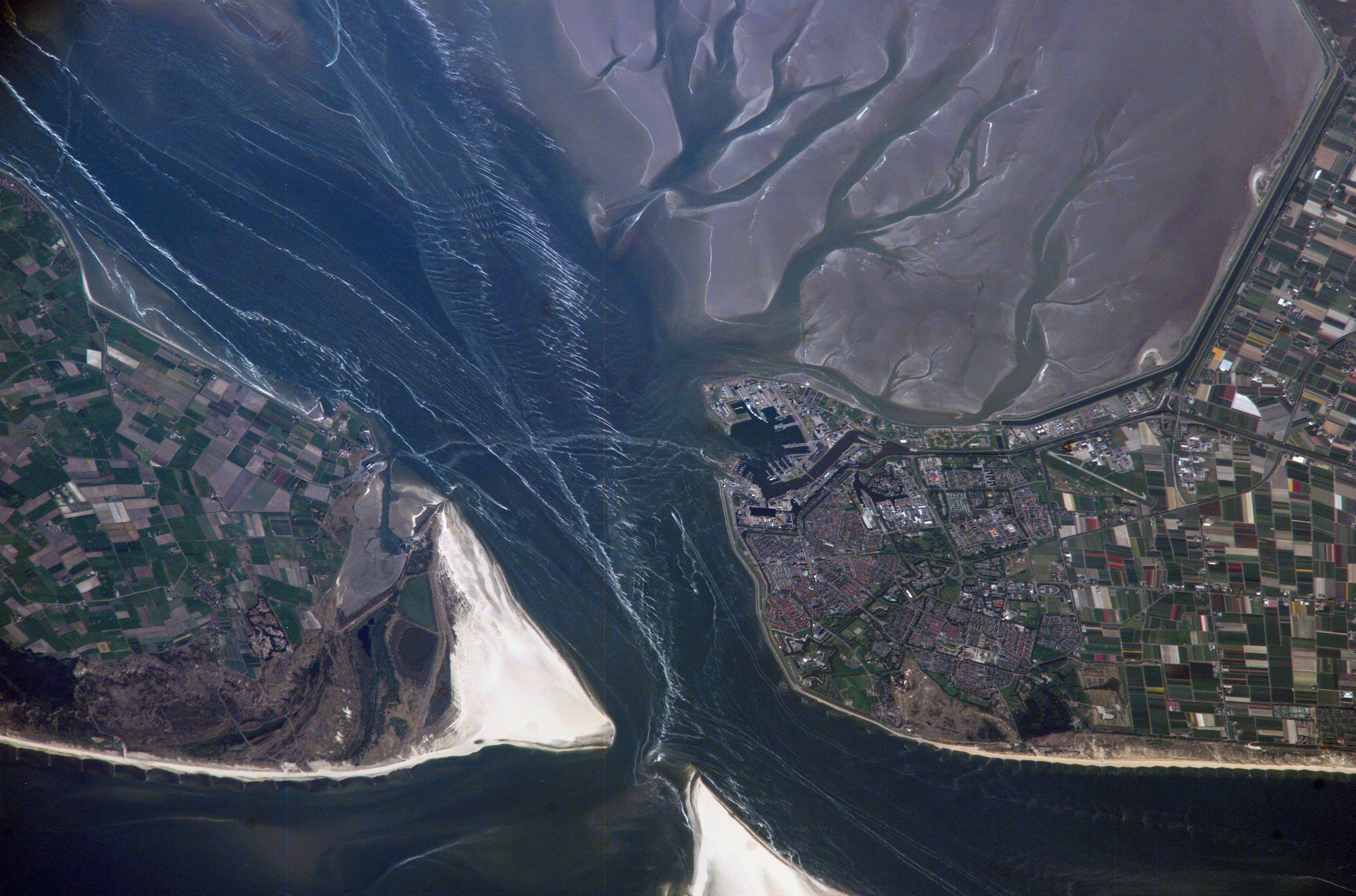
- Nieuwediep, in the center, started as the continuation of a Wadden Sea trench. (The north is on the left)
- Native name: Nieuwediep (Dutch)

Physical characteristics
- Source
  - coordinates: 52.946519°N 4.795072°E (former)
- Mouth
  - coordinates: 52.964905°N 4.780323°E (former)

Basin features
- Inland ports: Nieuwediep, Willemsoord, Veerhaven, Nieuwe Haven

Nieuwediep was a canal and harbor. In about 1800 the major naval base Willemsoord was constructed west of it, soon followed by a major commercial port. After World War II, Nieuwe Haven Naval Base was built on reclaimed land east of the Nieuwediep, and the Nieuwdiep's source and mouth were dammed off.

== Nieuwediep harbor ==
=== A trench in the Wadden Sea ===
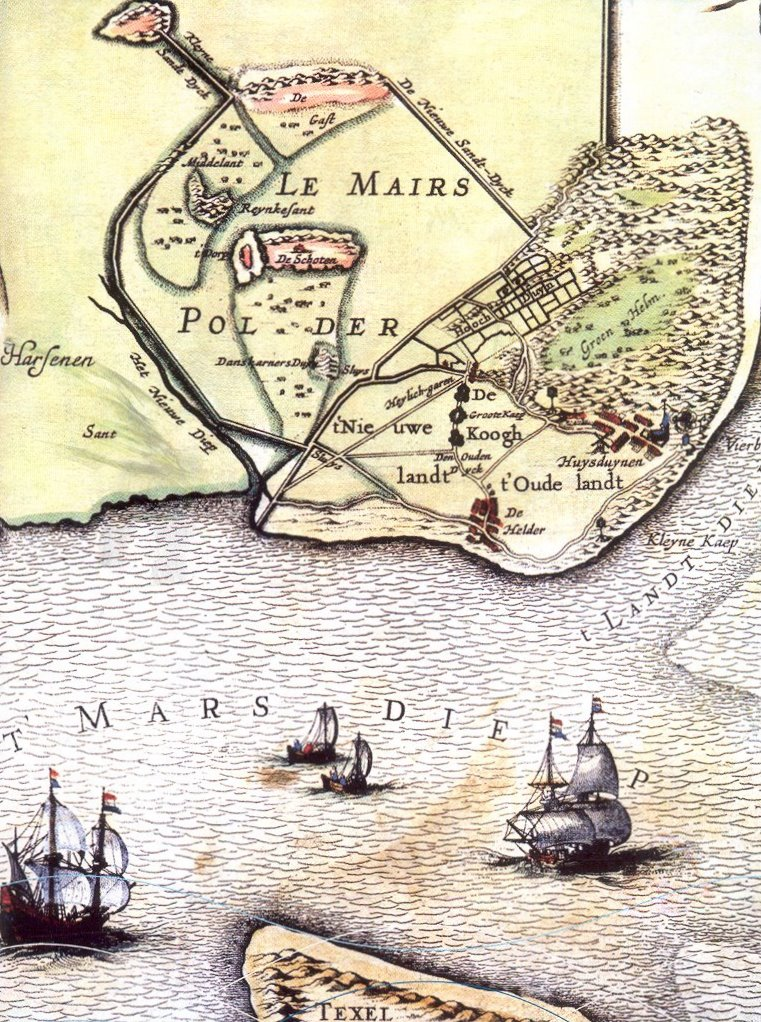
Nieuwediep left (east) of Le Mairs polder on a 1641 map by Claes Jansz. Visscher

Nieuwediep started out as a trench in the Wadden Sea, called Het Nieuwe Diep, which translates as 'the new canal'. After a polder had been made near Den Helder, the Nieuwediep ran very close to its eastern dyke. When the Nieuwe Diep became a harbor, 'Nieuwediep' became one word. The determiner 'the' (Dutch: Het) was often used very consciously with regard to Nieuwediep. Plain 'Nieuwediep' tends to refer to the old port, the old navy base, or the settlement near the canal. 'The Nieuwediep' refers only to the stretch of water, also as part of the current Port of Den Helder.

=== Need for a harbor near Den Helder ===
In the seventeenth and eighteenth century it became increasingly difficult for big ships to regularly sail to the Dutch cities on the Zuiderzee. Many ships therefore anchored in the Roadstead of Texel, where a lot of transloading was done by vessels that brought the cargo to Amsterdam and other cities. While these smaller vessels were waiting, they anchored safely in Nieuwediep, which was well protected by a shoal.

The importance of a protected base for the Dutch navy and commercial shipping near Den Helder was stressed by the Fourth Anglo-Dutch War. The Nieuwediep was an ideal location, but not deep enough for warships and East Indies ships, because there was a bump in the mouth of the Nieuwediep. A plan to make a useful and safe harbor for warships in the Nieuwediep was then made by: Captain W. May, equipage master of the Amsterdam Admiralty; C. Brunings, inspector general of the rivers; Surveyor B. Goudriaan, L. de Berge and P. Haage. They specified that such a harbor: should be big enough to lay ships at a sufficient distance from each other, should keep the ships safe from weather and Ice shove, should be deep 20 feet deep at ebb at the entrance, and 24 feet at ebb at the mooring places. The Nieuwediep only lacked the required depth. On 6 and 27 August 1781 a Commission was then mandated and ordered to execute this plan.

=== Constructing the harbor ===
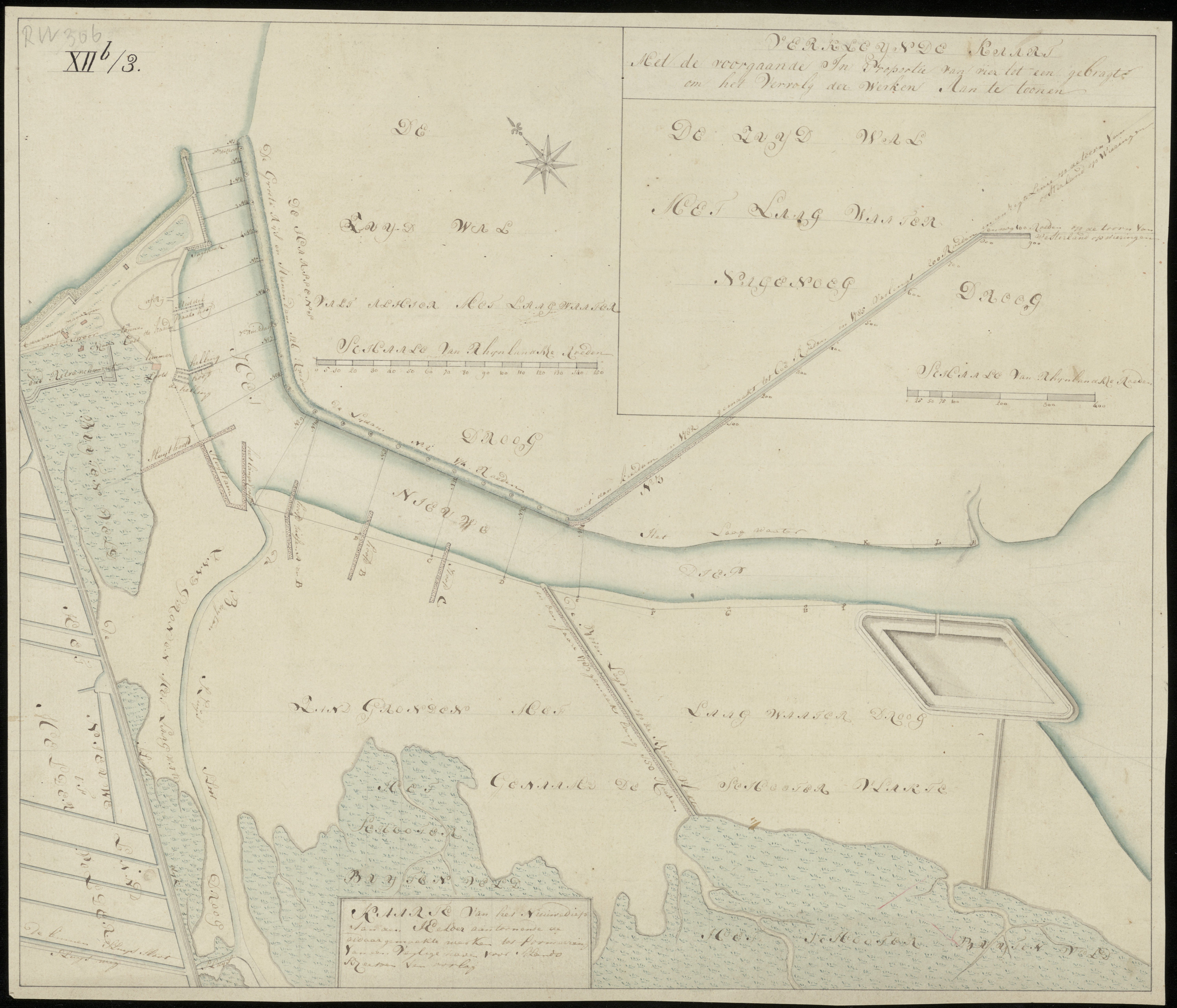
Nieuwediep with the dams that made it deeper. To the right the Nieuwe Werk of 1792.

On 5 September 1781 orders were given to create a stone dam east of the Nieuwdiep that would guide the ebb flow for 348,500 guilders. It was to be built in three parts (cf the map) The first part, the 'big stone and wood dam' (Groote Rijs en Steenen dam) was 475 meters long. The second part, a slate dam, Lijdam, was 655 m long. The third part, Keerdam, stretched east to catch the ebb flow and was 2260 m long. The second part was ready on schedule in June 1782. The delivery of the other parts was delayed by the difficulties in shipping the heavy stones required. In October 1782 the third part was finished, the first part following a few weeks later. Nevertheless, the first effects were shown when in August 1782 the bump in the mouth of the Nieuwediep was found to have been lowered by 1–1.5 feet. In October 1782 orders were then given to dredge out a way through the bump by December 1782. This became March 1783, but in April the depth had indeed reached over 19 feet, and some armed warships had already anchored in the harbor.

In June 1783 33,000 guilders were spent for a dam, lijdam, of 500 m stretching SSW from the southern entrance of the Nieuwediep, creating a funnel together with part 3. To facilitate ships, 8,800 guilders were spent on 7 dolphins (cf map). 58,000 guilders was reserved for further dredging, that (after delays) would be executed in 1784.

For big warships the depth was still not enough. Therefore, in 1785 the third part of the eastern dam was prolonged by 750 m, and then by another piece of 376 m stretching to the southwest. In 1785 the ships of the line wintered in Nieuwediep. Still, Nieuwediep was nothing more than a harbor. It lacked facilities like stores and repair shops, which would make it a real naval base.

=== Commercial Harbor ===
Nieuwediep immediately became a harbor that was important for commerce. Traditionally many ships were reluctant to sail to the Zuiderzee in the winter, because ice would often block the harbors. Now they could sail to Nieuwediep, which was ice-free most of the winter. In the winter of 1783–1784, 60–70 loaded ships wintered in Nieuwediep, safe from ice. It led to the creation of some more facilities for 30,000 guilders in 1784. A specific advantage was that ships from the south, loaded with perishable goods like fruits, could unload at Nieuwediep. In the winter of 1784–1785 there were 150 ships at Nieuwediep, among them merchant men with a draft of 18–20 feet laying somewhat at the bottom of the harbor. The transloading business also changed. It became safer because it could now be done in port, but it also became cheaper, because it took less time.

== Navy Base at Nieuwediep ==
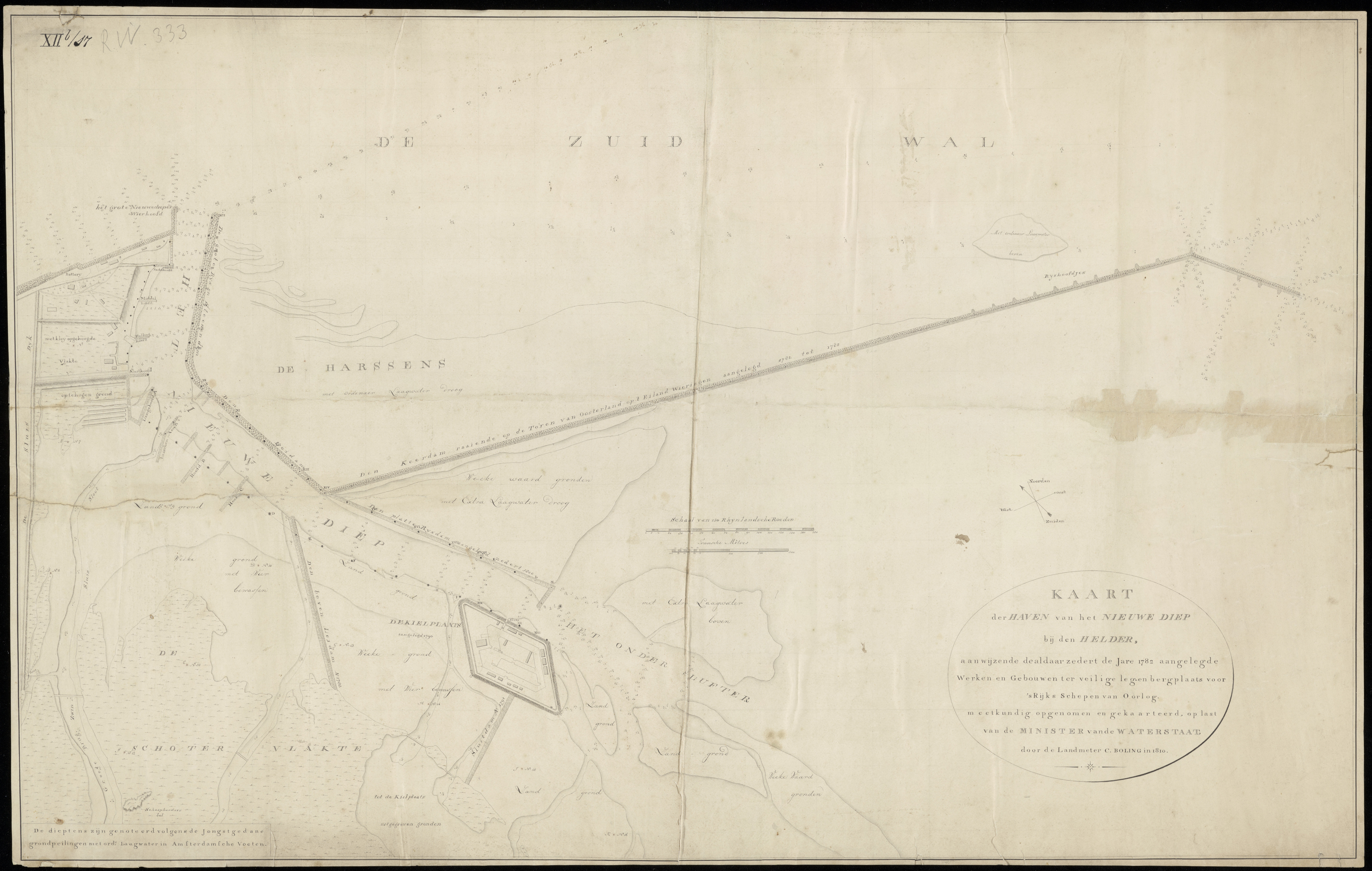
Nieuwediep with the Battery and Nieuwe Werk in 1810.

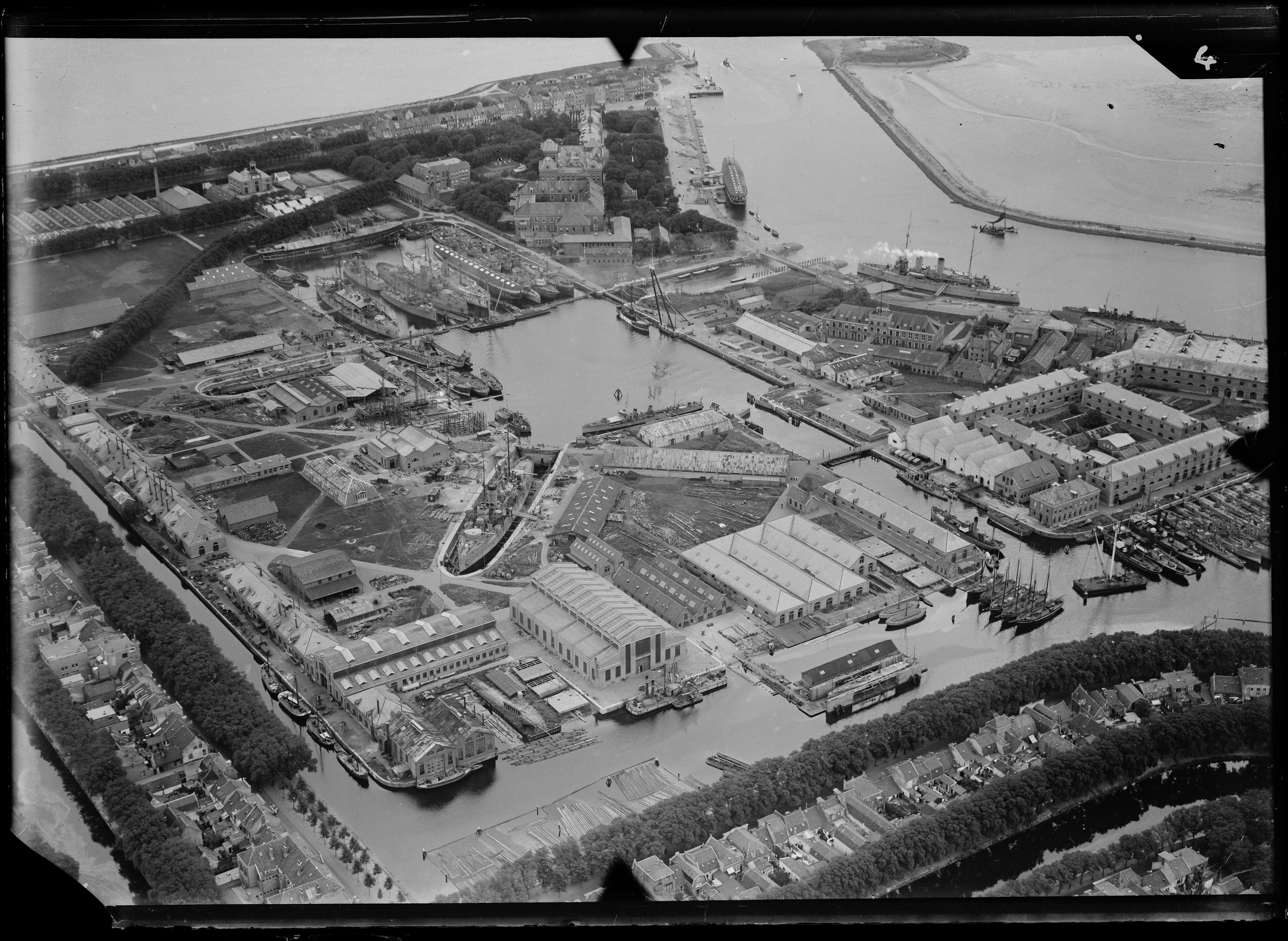
Willemsoord in full operation (1920–1940)

=== 'Het Nieuwe Werk' ===
By early 1786, Nieuwediep had proven to be a fine harbor for heavy warships. It then slowly became a naval base. In 1792 some field fortifications were made, followed by establishment of two batteries. In 1792 a repair facility and sophisticated careening place called 'Het Nieuwe Werk' was established. In 1793 a guardship, a well-armed hulk and some gunboats were stationed. After the Batavian Revolution the repair facility was expanded by the construction of some housing and a smithy. The Zuiderzee cities still succeeded in limiting the buildings. Many workmen were detached from Medemblik, and at ebb the base was surrounded by water.

In 1799 the Anglo-Russian invasion of Holland led to the capture of Nieuwediep and the Nieuwe Werk and the loss of about two dozen ships. In the subsequent Vlieter incident, a cornered Dutch fleet of eight ships of the line and four frigates then mutinied and surrendered without firing a shot. Efforts to fortify the position then started in 1803, but funds were limited. Meanwhile, operations continued in Nieuwediep. Warehouses were restored etc. In 1811 Napoleon Bonaparte visited Den Helder, and ordered the construction the biggest naval base and maintenance shipyard of the Netherlands, as well as an extensive ring of fortifications.

=== Willemsoord ===
Napoleon's plan for a navy base led to the construction of Willemsoord, west of the Nieuwediep. The first phase of construction started in 1811 and was completed in 1823. During this construction phase operations continued at 'Het Nieuwe Werk'. The first construction phase included many essential features of a navy base. There was a wet dock, a dry dock, careening place and a masting sheer. Other facilities included a smithy, coppering, mast storage, coal storage, etc. etc. Many of the buildings of the first phase are still standing.

In 1995–2000, the Dutch Navy left Willemsoord. Nowadays, Willemsoord is a maritime attraction park and new city center for Den Helder. It also houses multiple museums and museum ships such as HNLMS Bonaire and HNLMS Schorpioen.

== Stelling Den Helder ==
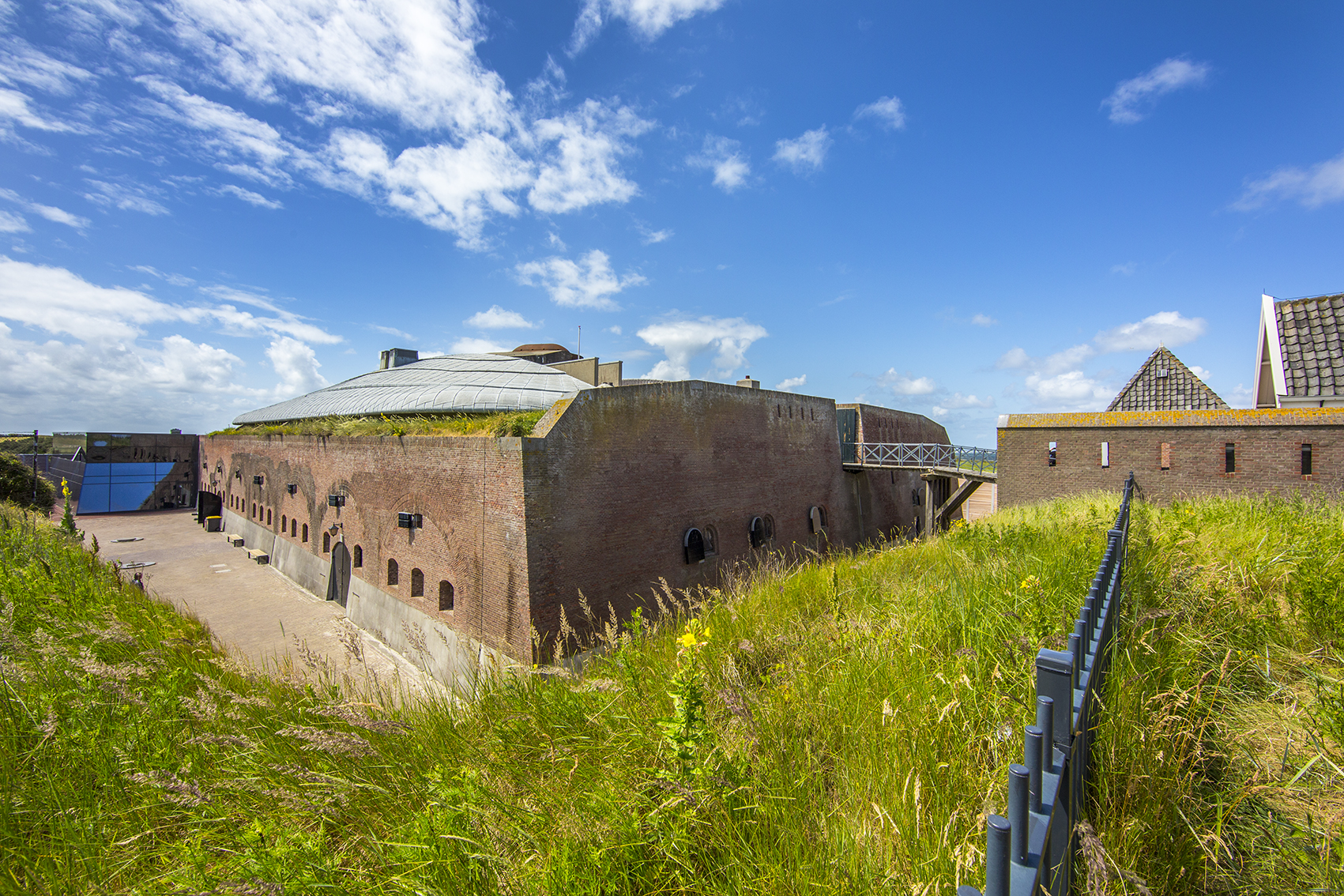
Fort Kijkduin

Fortifying the position around Nieuwdiep/Den Helder was the easy part of Napoleon's plans. It led to construction of the fortified position known as Stelling Den Helder. In a few years Fort Kijkduin, Fort Erfprins, Fort Dirks Admiraal were built. A bunch of strong fortresses and fortifications, centering on Den Helder. By 1813 these fortifications were so powerful that the French were able to maintain themselves in Den Helder when the Dutch threw off the French yoke. It led to the Siege of Den Helder in November 1813.

During the siege, the Dutch fleet in Den Helder, the so-called squadron of Texel consisted of; the ships of the line: Prince (80), Zoutman (80), De Ruyter (80), Evertsen (80) and Doggersbank; the frigates Meuse (44) and Ijssel (44) (both with French crews); the corvette Venus and the Brig Irene, as well as the French brig Iréne. In port and not ready were the ships of the line: Amsterdam (80), Brabant (76), Jean de Witt (68) and Rotterdam (68), and the frigates Aurora / Dageraad (32) and Maria Reijgersbergen (32). When the Bourbons were restored, the squadron of Texel came into Dutch hands again.

From 1879 to 1885, Fort Harssens was built at the shoal Harssens on the east end of the Nieuwediep. It was a modern and powerful fortress with 4 Krupp 30.5 cm guns placed in armored cupolas. These were the heaviest guns in the Dutch armed forces.

== Port of Nieuwediep ==
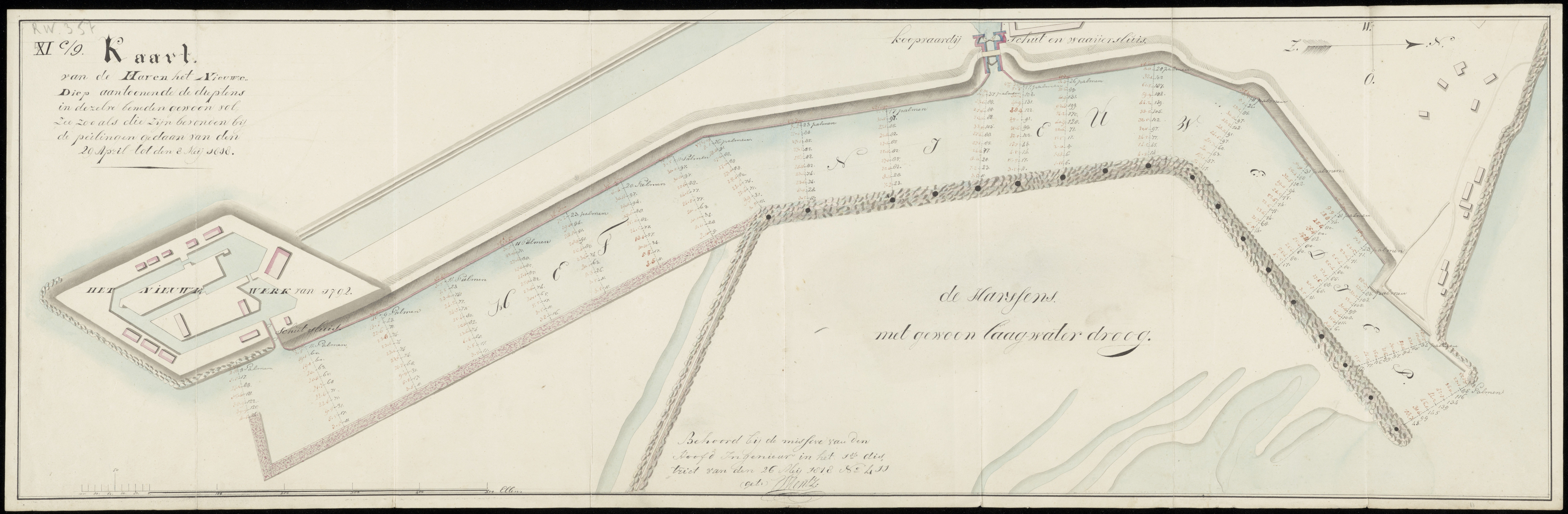
1818: Nieuwe Werk and first Merchant Lock

As mentioned above, the first use of Nieuwediep was commercial, and as it got deeper, its commercial use intensified. After the regained independence, the Dutch government was just as eager to press the commercial as the military facilities. Already in May 1816, the construction of a sea lock for the inner harbor of Nieuwediep was tendered. In August 1817 the first Koopvaarders Schutsluis (Merchantmen Lock) became operational for small vessels. On 17 October 1817, the Danish ship Christiana, Captain Hans Corssen, entered the lock, and continued to the partially complete inner harbor to be repaired.

Construction of the port did not benefit Nieuwediep significantly. Loading and unloading ships (except transloading) had been forbidden during the French occupation, and Amsterdam succeeded in prolonging this ban till 1851. In 1819 the plan for the Noordhollandsch Kanaal was made. It was intended to enable ocean going ships to reach Amsterdam via the port of Nieuwediep. Construction started in the summer of 1819 and the canal was opened in December 1824. Koopvaarders Lock was built to enable ocean-going ships to use the canal. Nevertheless, the canal was bad news for Nieuwediep, because it eliminated much of the transloading business. On the other hand, Nieuwediep gained some activity from ships wintering in port.

After the ban on handling ships was lifted, Nieuwediep became an important harbor. This was accelerated by the connection to the railway system, and the arrival of the SMN, whose East Indies ocean liners were simply too large for the Noordhollandsch Kanaal. After the opening of the North Sea Canal in 1876, the harbor went into a quick decline till not much was left. It was a heavy blow for Den Helder, the local population dropping by over 10%.

== Nieuwe Haven Navy Base ==
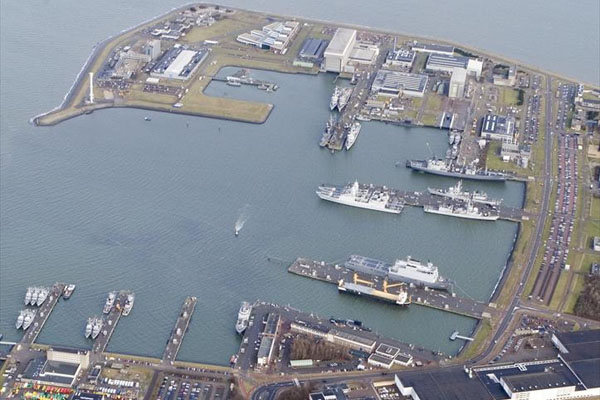
Nieuwe Haven

Already before World War I, Willemsoord had become too small for major warships. The wet dock was 325 meters long and 135 m wide. The entrance was at the long side, and by then even light cruisers were about 120 m long. In the 1920s the light cruiser Java of 155 m could not visit the wet dock. After World War II a new base was therefore created east of the Nieuwediep. This would become Nieuwe Haven Naval Base.

The new harbor was made by closing the mouth of the Nieuwediep. The beginning of the Nieuwediep was also closed, probably because artificial dredging had become so powerful that it was no longer necessary to keep the Nieuwediep at depth by profiting from the tidal current. In the eastern dam of the Nieuwediep, an opening was made to connect it to the new harbor.

The new harbor, and primarily the remaining part of the Nieuwediep, are used by the current commercial harbor known as 'Port of Den Helder'. It focuses on the offshore industry. At the former mouth of Nieuwdiep, is the terminal for the Texel ferry. The Den Helder municipality wants to tempt some of the Texel tourists to also visit Den Helder.
