= Nieuwe Haven Naval Base =

Dutch navy installation in Den Helder, North Holland, Netherlands

Nieuwe Haven Naval Base
- Den Helder, North Holland in the Netherlands
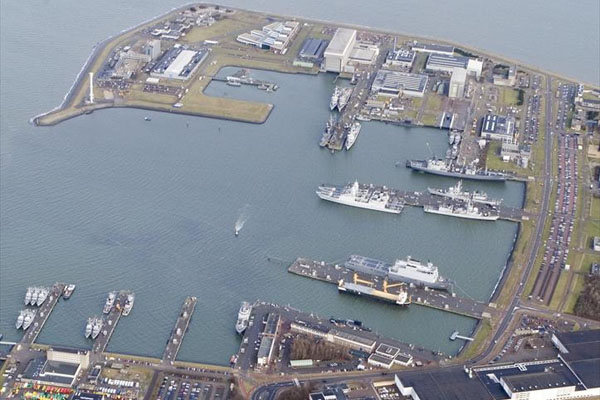
- Aerial view of the base

Site information
- Type: Naval Base
- Owner: Ministry of Defence
- Operator: Royal Netherlands Navy
- Open to the public: No

Location
- Coordinates: 52°57′21.6″N 04°47′22.3″E

Site history
- Built: 1949 - 1958
- In use: 2 July 1954 - present

Garrison information
- Occupants: Commander of the Royal Netherlands Navy

Nieuwe Haven is a Royal Netherlands Navy base in Den Helder and the largest naval base in the Netherlands.

== History ==
Already before World War I, Willemsoord had become too small for major warships. The wet dock was 325 m (1,066 ft 3 in) long and 135 m (442 ft 11 in) wide. The entrance was at the long side, and by then even light cruisers were about 120 m (393 ft 8 in) long. In the 1920s the light cruiser Java of 155 m (508 ft 6 in) could not visit the wet dock. After World War II, the Dutch government established a commission to find a site for a new naval base. It was given a choice between IJmuiden, Rotterdam, Vlissingen or Den Helder. In 1947 it was decided Den Helder would become the Netherlands' main naval base. A definitive plan for the new harbor was completed in 1948 and estimated its cost at 29 million florins.

For the construction of the new harbor an area east of the Nieuwediep was selected. Construction started in 1949 when the mouth of the Nieuwediep was dammed off. Reclaimed land was used to build the base. The new western part was officially opened in 1954 by HNLMS Karel Doorman. The rest of the base was completed in 1958.

Since the move of the submarine service from Rotterdam to the Nieuwe Haven, all naval vessels have Den Helder as their home port.

In 2015 it was reported that a new shore power supply was installed at the Nieuwe Haven Naval Base which consists of a high-voltage cable of 6.6 kilovolts. In 2025 the capacity of the shore power supply was expanded by Royal BAM Group.

In 2020 a request was submitted to Liander to upgrade the main electrical connection at naval base from 18 megawatt (MW) to 25 MW. This upgrade is expected to happen in 2028.

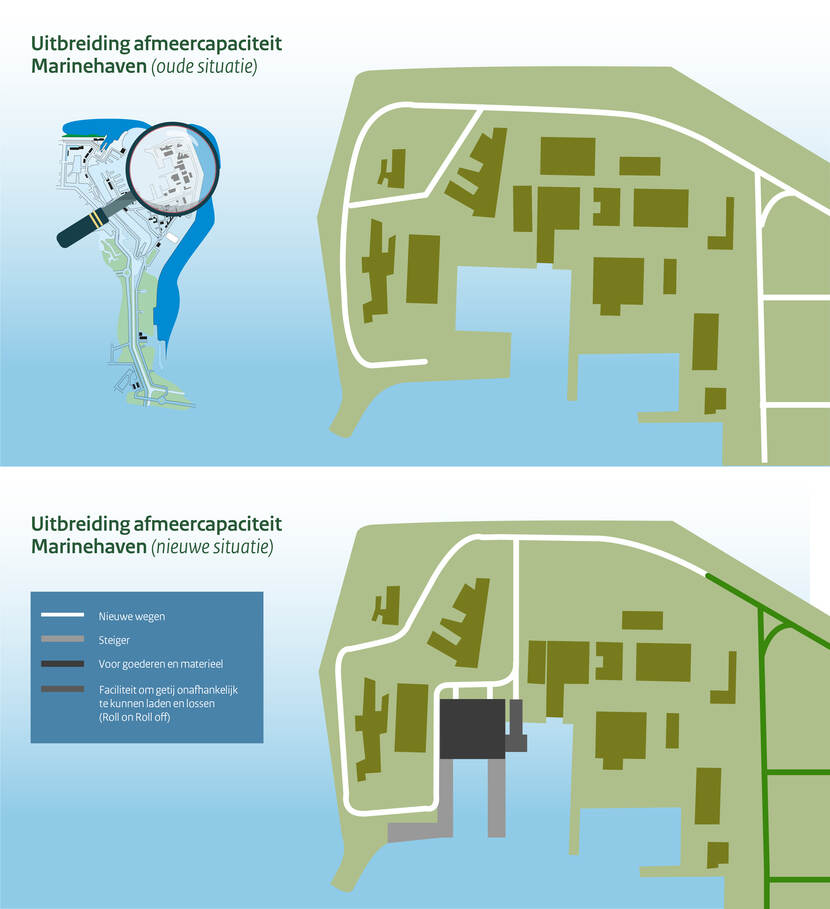
2023 expansion plans (old situation top, new situation bottom)

In April 2023 expansion plans were revealed for the eastern part of the base. This work is needed for two reasons:

- The navy is replacing a number of ships over the coming years. This will expand the fleet, both in the number of ships and the size of the new vessels.
- Safety reasons. Ships will not be allowed to be moored alongside each other when there are explosives (missiles, torpedoes, etc.) on board.

The expansion is estimated to cost between €100 million and €250 million, and should be finished by 2029. It will include new mooring facilities and create more space on the quays which can be used for storing containers and vehicles. The infrastructure related to the Royal Netherlands Navy Submarine Service will also be overhauled and expanded. The design of the new expansion will be tested in a simulator at MARIN in Wageningen. In July 2026 it was reported that Rijksvastgoedbedrijf had started the tender for the construction of new quays at the Berghaven.

== Facilities ==
=== Battery Testing Center ===
The Battery Testing Center (Dutch: Accu Test Centrum; ATC) is a facility at the Nieuwe Haven Naval Base that was established in 1988 to test, charge and discharge batteries. Since its inception it has been primarily used to test and charge the batteries that are aboard the submarines of the Royal Netherlands Navy.

=== Central Sickbay ===
Central Sickbay (Dutch: Centrale Ziekenboeg; CZB) is a hospital that provides healthcare for personnel of the Royal Netherlands Navy.

=== Nieuwe Rijkswerf ===
Nieuwe Rijkswerf is a naval shipyard of the Royal Netherlands Navy that is used for ship repair and maintenance.
